= Beyond Vaudeville =

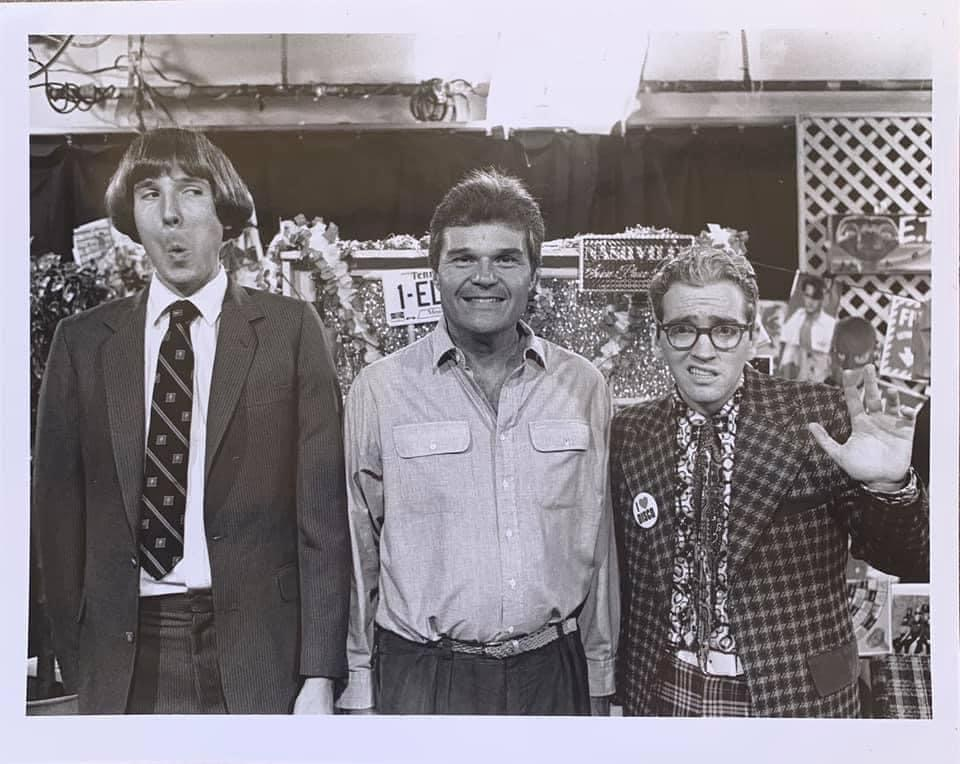
- Left to right: Co-host David Greene, guest Fred Willard, host Rich Brown
- Genre: Talk/Variety
- Directed by: Steve Korn
- Starring: Rich Brown as Frank Hope, David Greene, John Walsh as Joey the Monkey
- Country of origin: United States
- Original language: English
- No. of episodes: 75

Production
- Producer: Rich Brown
- Production location: New York City
- Running time: 29 minutes

Original release
- Release: 1986 – 1996

Beyond Vaudeville is a New York City public-access television show that ran from 1986 to 1996. The talk/variety show features amateur talents and nostalgia-inducing celebrities housed within the confines of a crowded, Manhattan-based public access television station. The show was inspired by the likes of The Uncle Floyd Show, The Joe Franklin Show, and Andy Kaufman. The perpetually fidgety and nerdy Frank Hope (Rich Brown) is the host. His co-host is David Greene, a very tall man who is always angry. Greene seems to not want to be part of the show, dislikes Hope, and often looks away in disgust. Greene spoke in the earlier episodes but became more silent in later episodes. This would continue once the show became Oddville, MTV. After a usually awkward live reading of the opening credits, the show begins with host Hope showing various nostalgic or geek culture items he bought at stores or garage sales. This sometimes angers Greene and he reacts with violence toward Hope.

The guests on the show are a mix of various celebrity guests from yesteryear, or outside the mainstream, including the likes of Tiny Tim, Bobby "Boris" Pickett ("Monster Mash"), and Grandpa Al Lewis. Hope's earnest but awkward interviewing style, with Greene's total uninterest and perpetual annoyance, is part of the humor. The show also features amateur singers, dancers, comedians, and other local eccentrics, with the mix of guests, and their reactions to each other, also being part of the humor. Various puppets appear behind the seats of the guests while they are interviewed, sometimes attempting to annoy Greene. For many of the episodes, Joey the Dancing Monkey (John Walsh) would be called on to do a skit or dance toward the end of the show. Joey wears a chimpanzee mask, a long red robe, and oversized gloves. He always begins to annoy Greene which produces a fight, while the guests usually look on in either horror or bafflement.

In 1997, MTV brought the show to cable under the title Oddville, MTV, a fundamentally similar program with the addition of an announcer in Melissa Gabriel and a segment featuring a popular musical act that was played straight. In order to produce the oddness the cable access show was known for, guests and Joey the Monkey dance along to the music.

The show was a strong example of anti-humor due to the humor being produced by its sheer weirdness and many awkward moments. It is also credited with discovering Suzanne Muldowney aka The Underdog Lady, who would go on to be a popular guest on The Howard Stern Show.

== Cast ==
- Rich Brown as host Frank Hope
- David Greene as himself
- John Walsh as Joey the Dancing Monkey

=== Recurring guests ===
- Lady Betty Aberlin (Mr. Rogers)
- Izzy Fertel (singer)
- Professional nose-whistler Jim Grosso
- M. Vinson Hayes (Marilyn Monroe conspiracy expert)
- Sci-fi expert Ronald Held
- Sci-fi collector Leslie Holcomb
- Suzanne Muldowney (interpretive dancer)
- Dee Nack the Female Elvis Impersonator
- Red Lightning (singer)
- Stryker (singer)
- Arthur Tracy (singer)
- Chairman Steve (poet)
- Tiny Tim (musician)
- Trayman (performs with trays)
- Austin Velez (singer)
- Neil Connie Wallace (comic)

== Episodes ==
Extended content

Episode Number	Date Recorded	Guests	Notable Information
1	December 9, 1986	Mason Reese, Underdog dancer Suzanne Muldowney, Kevin & His Friend Bub	
2	March 2, 1987	Al Lewis, poet Gretchen Weiner, Kevin & His Friend Bub	Significant for Al Lewis’ roast of co-host David Greene.
3	May 4, 1987	Omer Travers (broke into Yoko Ono's apartment), poet Chairman Steve, comedy team Book n Martino	
4	July 8, 1987	Psychic Frederick Davies, singer-songwriter Stryker, Glenn & His Friend Flubb	First appearance of Long Island singer and local celebrity Stryker, who featured in the Beyond Vaudeville live shows both before and after the show's run, and later appeared on Oddville, MTV and Jimmy Kimmel Live.
5	July 22, 1987	Gretchen Weiner, Richard H. Roffman, Body by Bob, Kevin & His Friend Bub, Glenn & His Friend Flubb, Joey the Monkey	First appearance of Joey the Monkey, who became a show regular and featured in every episode of Oddville, MTV, and of the puppets behind the couch.
6	October 6, 1987	Frank Nastasi (White Fang on The Soupy Sales Show), Austin Velez (guest co-host), UFO abductee Gertrude Adams, Cowboy Joe, Glenn & His Friend Flubb	
7	January 12, 1988	Tuli Kupferberg of The Fugs, Chairman Steve, Kevin & His Friend Bub, Glenn & His Friend Flub, Joey the Monkey	
8	February 25, 1988	Sammy Petrillo (Bela Lugosi Meets a Brooklyn Gorilla), former Burt Reynolds love interest Sen Tuna, Glenn & His Friend Flub, Joey the Monkey	
9	May 9, 1988	Quentin Crisp, mother-daughter comedy team Coco & Penny, Konstantin Bokov, Kevin & His Friend Bub, Glenn & His Friend Flub, Joey the Monkey	
10	June 13, 1988	Joe Franklin errand boy Chris Deola, Kerima the bellydancer, Dr. Morris Woodley	
11	July 19, 1988	Joyce Randolph with husband Richard Charles, comedian Jackie Jason Exit, Samson St. Clair as Joan Rivers	
12	August 30, 1988	Arthur Tracy, actor Marshall Efron	
13	October 4, 1988	Joe Franklin, artist Konstantin Bokov, elderly stripper Leola Harlow	
14	November 22, 1988	Lisa Sliwa, singer/songwriter Stryker, poet Chairman Steve, Austin Velez	
15	February 27, 1989	Entertainment journalist Michael Musto, actor Joe Fleishaker, sci-fi collector Leslie Holcomb, Joey the Monkey	Host Frank Hope walks off for several minutes in response to co-host David Greene's outbursts, leading to awkward exchanges between David and Musto. Frank returns later.
16	April 18, 1989	Memory expert Harry Lorayne, Danny the Wonderpony, movie usher Martin Spund, Bianco, Joey the Monkey	
17	May 23, 1989	Billy Dean's Knockouts Boxing Fighting Revue	Co-host David loses two boxing matches to Foxy Fighters Mariah and Mischa.
18	June 6, 1989	Phoebe Legere, a family of nudists, singer-songwriter Stryker, Underdog dancer Suzanne Muldowney	David claims to have locked Frank in the closet of his apartment and is hosting the show with Stryker as nominal co-host. The set is stripped down to bare walls and David attempts to conduct the program his way, with "The good guest that I got, and then the typical Frank guests here."
19	July 8, 1989	Filk singer Roberta Rogow, Underdog dancer Suzanne Muldowney, singer Ada Love, Bianco, Joey the Monkey	
20	August 18, 1989	Brother Theodore, Uncle Sam impersonator Joseph Erdelyi Jr., sci-fi collector Leslie Holcomb	
21	September 23, 1989	Ed Herlihy, Lady Betty Aberlin (Mr. Rogers), singer Starlady, T-shirt maker Martin Forro	
22	October 21, 1989	Joey Adams, Geoffrey Holder, Mr. Spoons	
23	October 21, 1989	Barry Williams, Wavy Gravy, Sukhreet Gabel	
24	November 18, 1989	Diver Dan, Rocky Horror Picture Show Fan Club president Sal Piro, nosewhistler Jim Grosso, comic Al Lawrence	
25	December 6, 1989	Little Mike Anderson, musical saw player Moses Josiah, UFO expert Phil Lord	A "missing episode," this was the second show after #18 not to be hosted by Frank (who was out due to a medical emergency); John Walsh (who was usually in costume as Joey the Monkey) was the guest host.
26	January 20, 1990	Professor Irwin Corey, Lady Betty Aberlin, female Elvis impersonator Dee Nack, driving instructor Bert Rapp, sci-fi collector Phil Depardo	
27	February 17, 1990	Judy Carne, Page Morton Black, cryonicist Curtis Henderson, singer Al Boland	
28	June 23, 1990	Taylor Mead, Ethyl Eichelberger, Baird Jones, Jack the Fire, Frank's Home Movies	
29	July 28, 1990	Terry Sweeney, Flying Nun Fan Club president, Dracula dancer Suzanne Muldowney, sci-fi collector Leslie Holcomb	
30	August 18, 1990	Marie Wallace, Dave Van Ronk, UFO expert Ellie Crystal, sci-fi collector Leslie Holcomb, Joey the Monkey	
31	September 17, 1990	Fred Willard, Underdog dancer Suzanne Muldowney, poet Wolf Pasmanik, comic Lou Baccala Cary, Joey the Monkey	First of two appearances by Fred Willard.
32	October 27, 1990	Austin Pendleton, Irene the Gong Show Queen of Long Island, singer Ada Love, Raelian Marie-Hélène Parent, Lady Betty Aberlin	
33	December 1, 1990	Singer and musician John Wallowitch, singer Buddy Clayton, The Green Monster, Joey the Monkey	
34	December 10, 1990	NYC News anchor Sue Simmons, musical saw player Moses Josiah, actress Martha Greenhouse, psychic Morris Fonte, Austin Velez, The Sonnenscheins, Joey the Monkey	
35	January 26, 1991	Audrey Landers, David Peel (musician), Alan Abel, Al Jolson impersonator Rich Curtis, comedian masseuse Brenda Kurz, Joey the Monkey	
36	February 20, 1991	Warner Wolf, Tiny Tim, The Chordettes, comic Dave West	First appearance of Tiny Tim.
37	March 16, 1991	Shirley Stoler, Toxic Avenger star Ron Fazio, singer Tommy Ritaco, Robert "Harmonica" Stevens, Pieman Aron Kay, Joey the Monkey	
38	April 20, 1991	Dan Lauria, Indian Elvis impersonator Nazar Sayegh, comedian Mildred Katz, Joey the Monkey	
39	June 8, 1991	Lew "Clarabell" Anderson, Little Mike Anderson, singer Regis Philbin Jr., sci-fi expert Ronald Held, pogo-stick record holder Ashrita Furman, Joey the Monkey plays singing glasses	
40	June 25, 1991	Carel Struycken, singer Izzy Fertel, toy collectors Pat Bishow and Lance, sci-fi collector Leslie Holcomb, Joey the Monkey as The Amazing Joenak	First television appearance of Izzy Fertel, who became a semi-regular on the program and subsequently appeared on Oddville, MTV and Jimmy Kimmel Live.
41	July 20, 1991	Frank "Large" Dellarosa, World's Fastest Hot Dog Eater; poet Wolf Pasmanik; rapper Larry Love; sci-fi expert Ronald Held	
42	July 30, 1991	Fred Willard, singer Izzy Fertel, singer Ada Love, belly dancer Kerima, rapper Larry Love, comedian Dave West, nose-whistler Jim Grosso, Joey the Monkey	
43	August 17, 1991	Remo Pisani, singer Buddy Clayton, Ramon Pena Cartucho, Hawaiian singer Johnny Kai, Joey the Monkey	
44	September 21, 1991	Bobby "Boris" Pickett, pierced guy Daniel Graham, sci-fi expert Ronald Held, Klingon League of Assault Warriors, singer Austin Velez, Joey the Monkey	
45	October 19, 1991	Tiny Tim, Benny Bell, tattoo experts Huggy Bear & Eek, Renaissance Man George Kayatta, Mr. Lucky & Stanley the Pig	
46	November 9, 1991	Sammy Petrillo, Suzie Perkovic, sci-fi expert Ronald Held, comic Mikhail Bleyckman, bowling alley expert Bill Newman, horror expert John Link, sci-fi collector Leslie Holcomb, Austin Velez, Joey the Monkey	
47	December 7, 1991	Christmas Special. John Wallowitch, Bill Gaines, Marilyn Monroe conspiracy expert M. Vinson Hayes, sci-fi collector Leslie Holcomb, The Public Access Choir, Joey the Monkey	One of the last interviews Gaines gave before he died in June 1992. The Public Access Choir was a group of hosts of other New York public access shows (G Street Live, The Grube Tube, My Craft Show), who came on set and sang "The Twelve Days of Christmas"
48	January 11, 1992	Bern Nadette Stanis, comic Mikhail Bleyckman, filk singer Roberta Rogow, songwriter Stryker, Tiny Tim goes bowling	
49	March 27, 1992	Joey Faye, Judy Faye, sci-fi expert Ronald Held, actor Joe Fleishaker, Marilyn Monroe conspiracy expert M. Vinson Hayes, Joey the Monkey	
50	June 4, 1992	Pat Cooper, FDR Impersonator Ellsworth Barthen, Madonna impersonator Queerdonna, Trayman, Walt Paper, Joey the Monkey	
51	July 16, 1992	Arthur Tracy, sci-fi expert Steve Maurer, Ice Bears Rabbi Abraham Abraham, Marilyn Monroe conspiracy expert M. Vinson Hayes, Trayman	
52	August 15, 1992	Underdog dancer Suzanne Muldowney, William Brown, singer Alan Chusid, Trayman	The first of six appearances by William Brown, billed as "Renaissance Man."
53	September 15, 1992	Alison Steele, Chauncey Howell, anchor Marvin Scott, William Brown, bagpipe player Dan Armstrong, comic Dave West, Joey the Monkey	In a 2023 interview, William Brown revealed one reason why he danced wildly in the middle of the studio, upstaging Joey the Monkey in the process, when Dan Armstrong played a tune on the bagpipes: to prevent mayhem between Joey and David Greene from breaking out during that number.
54	October 17, 1992	Ron Palillo, William Brown, Trayman, Champ the Wonderdog, sci-fi expert Ronald Held, Joey the Monkey	In 2001, William Brown would star in an independent short feature film, Lefty-Right. His boss in the movie was played by the son of Champ the Wonderdog's trainer and owner.
55	December 22, 1992	Barton Heyman, William Brown, movie collectors Mike Tower and Arthur Ritzer, dancer Jimmy Del Rio	
56	February 27, 1993	Kitty Carlisle Hart, William Brown, Trayman, The Greater Gotham Gaylaxians, songwriter Stryker, Joey the Monkey	
57	July 6, 1993	Singing nun Sister Mary Beata Gerrity, Cuban singer Margarita Pracatan, artist Hoop, sci-fi collector Leslie Holcomb, Austin Velez, Joey the Monkey	
58	August 7, 1993	Virginia Graham, Monti Rock III, artist Hoop, Frank Sinatra fan Bernice Perry, singer Tommy Ritaco, Austin Velez, Joey the Monkey	
59	September 11, 1993	Kaye Ballard, Lara Jill Miller, William Brown, singer Red Lightning, comic Arthur of New York, Joey the Monkey	The last of William Brown's six appearances. He would never appear on Oddville, MTV, but would appear in a crowd scene in Times Square in an edition of Jimmy Kimmel Live.
60	November 20, 1993	Larry Storch, Banjo-Playing Priest George Swanson, nose-whistler Jim Grosso, Louise Grosso, Trayman, inventor Jack Marchand, Joey the Monkey	
61	December 18, 1993	Kim Hunter, Chauncey Howell, singer Margarita Pracatan, singer Red Lightning, angel expert Eileen Freeman, Joey the Monkey	
62	January 8, 1994	Actor Michael Berryman, married couple actress Katy Dierlam and artist Ned Sonntag, sci-fi expert John Link, sci-fi collector Leslie Holcomb, Joey the Monkey	
63	March 7, 1994	Shirley Jones, Marty Ingels, Trayman, Red Lightning	
64	April 13, 1994	Rick Derringer, comic Marty Gangursky, Three Stooges Fans Harold, Lucille, and Robert Gurau, Chinese opera singer Mr. Chen Tsun Kit, Austin Velez, Joey the Monkey	Rick Derringer's toddler daughter Mallory wanders onto the set and spends most of the show ambling around or sitting on Derringer's lap. David manages to sit through the entire program without a violent outburst.
65	July 16, 1994	Jimmy Breslin, poet Chairman Steve, Yankees fan Freddie Sez, Al Jolson singer Rich Curtis, actor Marty Gangursky, Kenneth Keith Kallenbach, Joey the Monkey	
66	October 29, 1994	Thanksgiving Special. Underdog dancer Suzanne Muldowney, Kenneth Keith Kallenbach, rapper/granny Fruity Nutcake, Marilyn Monroe conspiracy expert M. Vinson Hayes, Joey the Monkey	
67	March 25, 1995	Imogene Coca, poet Chairman Steve, "Quiz Show" legend Herb Stempel, singer Buddy Clayton, comic Neil Connie Wallace, Joey the Monkey	
68	April 29, 1995	Jack Riley, Pat McCormick, comic Neil Connie Wallace, raconteur Leonard Ben Meyer, Red Lightning, Joey the Monkey	
69	May 13, 1995	Tom Arnold, comic Neil Connie Wallace, Underdog dancer Suzanne Muldowney, raconteur Leonard Ben Meyer, Joey the Monkey	
70	July 11, 1995	Soleil Moon Frye, "The Singing Cowgirl from Queens" Lorraine Roof, Marilyn Monroe conspiracy theorist M. Vinson Hayes, comic Neil Connie Wallace	
71	September 5, 1995	The Del Rubio Triplets, comic Neil Connie Wallace, comic cabbie Albert Mustakoff, Groom Tiny Tim, Bride Miss Sue, Joey the Monkey	
72	September 15, 1995	Johnny Whitaker, Billy Barty, raconteur Leonard Sragow, poet Chairman Steve, Joey the Monkey	
73	November 27, 1995	Singer Joey Marlowe, poet Bingo Gazingo, comic Neil Connie Wallace, Joey the Monkey	
74	December 13, 1995	Tiny Tim, Arthur Tracy, Izzy Fertel, poet Chairman Steve	
75	May 25, 1996	Super Special KISS Tribute Spectacle Program Show. Kiss Collector Bill Baker, poet Bingo Gazingo, Joey the Monkey	
76	July 1, 1996	Lady Betty Aberlin, Freddie Sez Schulman, Florence Miller Dancers, comic Neil Connie Wallace, Rich Curtis, Gaylord, Joey the Monkey	

== Live Stage Shows ==
Extended content

Date	Title	Venue	Host	Guests
March 20, 1982	Beyond Vaudeville	NYU Eisner & Lubin Auditorium	Hugh Fink and the Hugh Fink Orchestra	David Greene as "Thomas Paine," Stryker, Rescue #1, Cinti Laird, Dean Zerbe, A/K/A, Ben Brody (13-year-old comic), Ed Rollin, Rob Harari, Herd Cooper, Joseph Erdelyi as Uncle Sam, Vault, Nancy Heller, Andy Friedman
April 6, 1983	Beyond Vaudeville II	NYU Eisner & Lubin Auditorium		Mary Samford (street singer), Lizalotta Valeska (Miss Finland 1930), Irv Bruder, philosopher Joseph Feldman, Stryker, David Greene as "Thomas Paine", Bert Bedell, Irene & John Weidenberner
March 30, 1984	Beyond Vaudeville III	NYU Pub	Frank Moshman	Stryker, ventriloquist Anthony Thomas, Max Sofsky, Joseph Erdelyi Jr. as Uncle Sam, Gerry Schwartz, David Greene as "Thomas Paine," Bert Bedell, Irene Weidenberner, and "A Debate on the Existence of God" by Joseph Feldman and Robert Sharf
April 18, 1985	Beyond Vaudeville IV	Speakeasy NYC	Mason Reese	Stryker, Patsy Margolin, Lance Venture, Mildred Budwal, Delta Blues, David Greene as "Thomas Paine," Bert Bedell, Dee Nack the Female Elvis, Michael Kaufman, Billy Jacket, Irene & John Weidenberner, philosopher Mr. Feldman
April 30, 1986	Beyond Vaudeville V	NYU Eisner & Lubin Auditorium	Danny Bonaduce	Stryker, Suzanne Muldowney as Underdog, Joseph Erdelyi Jr. as Uncle Sam, Gretchen Weiner, Bert Bedell, Dee Nack the Female Elvis, poet Chairman Steve, Irene & John Weidenberner, Omer Travers, Lance Venture, David Greene as "Thomas Paine," philosopher Mr. Feldman
April 20, 1987	Beyond Vaudeville Live	NYU Eisner & Lubin Auditorium	Al Lewis	Mother-daughter comedy team Coco & Penny, John & Irene Weidenberner, Gretchen Weiner, Stryker, poet Chairman Steve, Dee Nack the Female Elvis, Dr. Lawrence Biris, Omer Travers, philosopher Mr. Feldman, comedy team Book N Martino, Suzanne Muldowney as Vlad the Impaler, David Greene as "Thomas Paine"
April 15, 1988	Beyond Vaudeville Live	NYU Eisner & Lubin Auditorium	Adam West	Suzanne Muldowney as Supergirl, Stryker, philosopher Mr. Feldman, Dee Nack the Female Elvis, David Greene as "Thomas Paine," John & Irene Weidenberner, Kerima the Bellydancer, Tuli Kupferberg, Gretchen Weiner, Sammy Petrillo, Bert Bedell, Wally Haughey, Coco & Penny, Chairman Steve the Poet Laureate of Greenwich Village, Konstantin Bokov
April 11, 1989	Beyond Vaudeville Live	NYU Eisner & Lubin Auditorium	Sukhreet Gabel	Stryker, Kerima the Bellydancer, David Greene as "Thomas Paine," Ada Love, Danny the Wonderpony, Dee Nack the Female Elvis, Suzanne Muldowney as Underdog, mother-daughter comedy team Coco & Penny, poet Chairman Steve, philosopher Mr. Feldman
April 19, 1990	Beyond Vaudeville Live	NYU Eisner & Lubin Auditorium	Peter Tork & Quentin Crisp	Stryker, Kerima the Bellydancer, David Greene as "Thomas Paine," Michael J. Anderson, Danny the Wonderpony, Dee Nack the Female Elvis, Suzanne Muldowney as Underdog, Professional Nosewhistler Jim Grosso, philosopher Mr. Feldman
May 6, 1991	Beyond Vaudeville Live	Stand Up New York	Little Mike Anderson	Stryker, Kerima the Bellydancer, David Greene as "Thomas Paine," Moses Josiah & His Musical Saw, Suzanne Muldowney as Underdog, Wolf Pasmanik, Dee Nack the Female Elvis, Joey the Monkey, Danny the Wonderpony, Professional Nosewhistler Jim Grosso, Irene Weidenberner
May 11, 1992	Beyond Vaudeville Live	Caroline's on Broadway	Ron Palillo	Stryker, Moses Josiah & His Musical Saw, David Greene as "Thomas Paine," Suzanne Muldowney as Underdog, Izzy Fertel, Joey the Monkey, Danny the Wonderpony, Little Mike Anderson, Dee Nack the Female Elvis, Professional Nosewhistler Jim Grosso, poet Chairman Steve
April 26, 1993	Beyond Vaudeville Live	Caroline's on Broadway	Barbara Feldon	Stryker, Suzanne Muldowney as Catwoman, Moses Josiah & His Musical Saw, Trayman, Jimmy Del Rio, Izzy Fertel, Dee Nack the Female Elvis, Benny Bell, Professional Nosewhistler Jim Grosso, Queerdonna
October 28, 1993	Beyond Vaudeville Live	Caroline's on Broadway	Pat Cooper	Suzanne Muldowney as Spectrum the Ghost King, Red Lightning, Professional Nosewhistler Jim Grosso, Jimmy Del Rio, Stryker, Filksinger Roberta Rogow, Dee Nack the Female Elvis, Moses Josiah and his Musical Saw, Joey the Monkey, Benny Bell, Trayman, Izzy Fertel and Tiny Tim
December 5, 1994	Beyond Vaudeville Live	Caroline's on Broadway	Carol Shaya	Red Lightning, Professional Nosewhistler Jim Grosso, banjo playing priest George Swanson, Suzanne Muldowney, granny rapper Fruity Nutcake, Stryker, Joey the Monkey, Irene Weidenberner, Kenneth Keith Kallenbach, opera singer Chen Tsun Kit, Margarita Pracatan, Dee Nack the Female Elvis, Moses Josiah and his Musical Saw
April 22, 2017	Beyond Vaudeville Live	PhilaMOCA	Frank Hope & David Greene	Suzanne Muldowney as Underdog, strongman Stanley "Stanless Steel" Pleskun, singer-songwriter Milo Turk. (While listed in credits as "BEYOND VAUDEVILLE Episode 75," this was a live stage show recorded in front of a live audience at Philadelphia Mausoleum of Contemporary Art.)
November 13, 2025	Beyond Vaudeville Live!	Comedy Village Times Square	Frank Hope & David Greene	Suzanne Muldowney as Underdog, The Amazing Amy with her Star Trek Contortions, The Zambonis, Funnyman Mario Bosco, The Musical Hands of Bruce Gaston, The Song Stylings of Mr. Phil. (Event produced by New York Comedy Festival.)
