= Love Is the Look You're Looking For =

Love Is the Look You're Looking for

Compilation album by Connie Smith
- Released: February 1973
- Recorded: April 1966 – January 1972
- Studio: RCA Victor Studios
- Genre: Country
- Label: RCA Victor
- Producer: Bob Ferguson

Connie Smith chronology
If It Ain't Love and Other Great Dallas Frazier Songs (1972)	Love Is the Look You're Looking for (1973)	A Lady Named Smith (1973)

Singles from Love Is the Look You're Looking for
- 1. "Love Is the Look You're Looking for" Released: December 1972

Love Is the Look You're Looking for is a compilation album by American country singer Connie Smith, released in February 1973 by RCA Victor. It was Smith's third compilation released by RCA Victor and mostly included previously recorded material. The album was named for the title track, which became a top ten single on the North American country singles charts. The album itself would chart on the American country LP's chart in 1973.

== Background and content ==
Beginning with Smith's first RCA Victor single ("Once a Day"), Smith had a series of top ten and top twenty singles on the country charts during the 1960s and early 1970s. After discovering Christianity in 1968, Smith continued recording for RCA but became less interested in her career. Yet, she continued releasing top ten singles, including three in 1972. Among these 1972 top ten songs was "Love Is the Look You're Looking For", composed by Rose Lee Maphis. The song would eventually serve as the name to Smith's 1973 RCA Victor compilation. By 1973, Smith had chosen not to renew her contract with RCA, believing that the label failed to give her the musical attention she previously received.

Instead of a full-length album, RCA compiled a series of previously recorded songs from Smith's years at RCA Victor. The only new recording would be the title track. The album's sessions were held between April 1966 and January 1972 at the RCA Victor Studios in Nashville, Tennessee. The album featured production from Bob Ferguson, Smith's long-time producer. The compilation included ten tracks in total. Included on the album were two of Smith's top five country singles from the 1960s: "Ain't Had No Lovin'" and "Burning a Hole in My Mind". It also included the 1968 top 20 single, "Cry, Cry, Cry". The album also featured a French version of Smith's breakout single, "Once a Day". The French version was titled "Pas Souvent" was not previously released in the United States.

== Release, chart performance and singles ==
Love Is the Look You're Looking For was released in February 1973 on the RCA Victor label. It was the third compilation released by RCA in Smith's career. The label distributed the album as a vinyl LP, containing five songs on each side of the record. The album debuted on the American Billboard Country LP's chart on February 24, 1973. It spent seven weeks on the chart and peaked at the number 24 position on March 24, 1973. The album's title track was the only single included on the collection and was first released by RCA in December 1972. The single became Smith's eighteenth top ten single on the Billboard Hot Country Songs chart, peaking at the number eight position in March 1973. In Canada, the song became her fourth top ten single on the RPM Country Tracks chart, peaking at number six.

== Track listing ==
Side one
No.	Title	Writer(s)	Length
1.	"Love Is the Look You're Looking for"	Rose Lee Maphis	2:09
2.	"How Great Thou Art"	Stuart K. Hine	4:10
3.	"It'll Be Easy"	Jan Crutchfield	2:35
4.	"Burning a Hole in My Mind"	Cy Coben	2:20
5.	"Ain't Had No Lovin'"	Dallas Frazier	2:16

Side two
No.	Title	Writer(s)	Length
1.	"If I Could Just Get Over You"	Kay Arnold	2:36
2.	"Born to Sing"	Coben	2:05
3.	"Cry, Cry, Cry"	Shirley Wood	2:29
4.	"It's Now or Never"	Wally Gold; Aaron Schroeder	3:13
5.	"Pas Souvent" (French version of "Once a Day")	Bill Anderson	2:21

== Chart performance ==
Chart (1973)	Peak position
US Top Country Albums (Billboard)	24

== Release history ==
Region	Date	Format	Label	Ref.
North America	February 1973	Vinyl	RCA Victor Records	
