= I Love Charley Brown =

Studio album by Connie Smith
- Released: April 1968
- Recorded: February 27, 1967 – February 28, 1968
- Studio: RCA Victor Studios
- Genre: Country; pop
- Label: RCA Victor
- Producer: Bob Ferguson

Connie Smith chronology
Soul of Country Music (1967)	I Love Charley Brown (1968)	Sunshine and Rain (1968)

Singles from I Love Charley Brown
- 1. "Burning a Hole in My Mind" Released: September 1967; 2. "Baby's Back Again" Released: December 1967; 3. "Run Away Little Tears" Released: April 1968

I Love Charley Brown is the tenth studio album by American country singer Connie Smith, released in April 1968 by RCA Victor. The album reached the top 20 of the American country albums chart. It was described as a collection of pop-inspired country songs. Included were four cuts written by Smith's longtime songwriting collaborator, Dallas Frazier. Among his cuts was one of the album's three singles, "Run Away Little Tears". Along with Frazier's cut, the two additional singles included ("Burning a Hole in My Mind" and "Baby's Back Again") reached the top ten of the American country songs chart. The album was met with favorable reviews from critics.

== Background ==
Connie Smith broke through into mainstream country success with her 1964 debut single, "Once a Day". The song spent eight weeks at the top of the country chart and set forth a series of uninterrupted top ten country singles through 1968. These songs included "Then and Only Then" (1965), "Ain't Had No Lovin'" (1966) and "The Hurtin's All Over" (1967). "Baby's Back Again", "Burning a Hole in My Mind" and "Run Away Little Tears" would reach the top ten between 1967 and 1968 and help comprise Smith's tenth studio album, I Love Charley Brown. The name of the album was derived from the title track written by songwriter Dallas Frazier. Not to be confused with comic strip character of the same name, the name was "a female variation" of the single "I Love Lucy Brown", which Frazier had first composed for Little Jimmy Dickens.

== Recording and content ==
The recording sessions for I Love Charley Brown were completed between February 27, 1967 and February 28, 1968 at RCA Victor Studios in Nashville, Tennessee. The sessions were produced by Bob Ferguson. The album was described by writers and reviewers as a "pop" project. According to biographer Barry Mazor, the material for I Love Charley Brown was "pop of the sort Ms. Smith found most agreeable". Among the pop-inspired material chosen for the project was Cy Coben's "Burning a Hole in My Mind". Smith was hesitant about cutting the song and recorded it twice. A second cut of the track was ultimately chosen for the final project. Four selections for the album were composed by Dallas Frazier. Smith developed more interest in Frazier's material during this time and would eventually record even more of his material on later projects. Frazier also wrote the album's liner notes.

Other Frazier-penned tunes for the album were the title track, "Sunshine of My World", "Between Each Tear" and "Run Away Little Tears". Smith later commented that the latter track was "one of my all-time favorite Dallas Frazier songs." She has kept the song as part of her concert set list since it was first recorded. Smith also recorded Betty Jean Robinson's "Baby's Back Again" for the album. It was described by biographer Colin Escott as "bouncy". Smith also recorded the Willie Nelson-penned "Little Things". Although Nelson had released his own version as a single, Smith liked the track, stating that it's "a great song with a great story".

== Release and reception ==
Professional ratings
Review scores
Source	Rating
Allmusic	3/5 stars

I Love Charley Brown was originally released in April 1968 on the RCA Victor label. It was Smith's tenth studio album released in her career and her ninth with RCA Victor. The label originally distributed the album as a vinyl LP, containing six songs on each side of the record. Decades later, the album was re-released to digital and streaming markets through Sony Music Entertainment. In its original release, the disc spent 17 weeks on the American Billboard Top Country Albums chart, peaking at number 14 in July 1968. It was Smith's third album to peak in the top 20 of the albums chart. I Love Charley Brown received a positive response from Billboard magazine in May 1968. "Add Dallas Frazier's fine title song, plus other winning performances by Miss Smith on the nine other cuts and you have a set with considerable appeal," the publication commented. AllMusic (which incorrectly labeled the LP I Love Charlie Brown) rated the album three out of five stars. They named "Burning a Hole in My Mind" and "Run Away Little Tears" as "album picks".

A total of three singles were included on I Love Charley Brown. The first of these singles was "Burning a Hole in My Mind", which RCA Victor first released in September 1967. The single spent 15 weeks on the Billboard Hot Country Songs chart and peaked at the number five position in December 1967. The single became Smith's tenth song to reach the country top ten. The second single included was "Baby's Back Again", released by RCA Victor in December 1967. Spending 17 weeks on the Billboard country songs chart, it climbed to number seven in March 1968 and became her eleventh top ten single. Additionally, "Baby's Back Again" became her first single to chart on Canada's RPM Country Songs chart, peaking at number seven. The third (and final) single included on the project was "Run Away Little Tears", which RCA Victor issued in April 1968. It spent 15 weeks on the Billboard country chart, peaking at number ten in July 1968 and became her twelfth top ten single in a row.

== Track listings ==
=== Vinyl version ===
Side one
No.	Title	Writer(s)	Length
1.	"Run Away Little Tears"	Dallas Frazier	2:28
2.	"Sunshine of My World"	Frazier	2:08
3.	"That's All This Old World Needs"	Demetrius Tapp; Bob Tubert	2:05
4.	"Little Things"	Shirley Nelson; Willie Nelson	3:00
5.	"If the Whole World Stopped Lovin'"	Ben Peters	2:30
6.	"Don't Feel Sorry for Me"	Ted Harris	2:13

Side two
No.	Title	Writer(s)	Length
1.	"I Love Charley Brown"	Frazier	2:39
2.	"Burning a Hole in My Mind"	Cy Coben	2:20
3.	"Baby's Back Again"	Betty Jean Robinson	2:18
4.	"Let Me Help You Work It Out"	Jerry Foster	2:13
5.	"Between Each Tear"	Frazier	2:33
6.	"There Are Some Things"	Betty Anderson; Red Hayes	2:58

=== Digital version ===
I Love Charley Brown (download and streaming)
No.	Title	Writer(s)	Length
1.	"Run Away Little Tears"	Frazier	2:31
2.	"Sunshine of My World"	Frazier	2:12
3.	"That's All This Old World Needs"	Tapp; Tubert	2:09
4.	"Little Things"	S. Nelson; W. Nelson	3:07
5.	"If the Whole World Stopped Lovin'"	Peters	2:36
6.	"Don't Feel Sorry for Me"	Harris	2:18
7.	"I Love Charley Brown"	Frazier	2:43
8.	"Burning a Hole in My Mind"	Coben	2:25
9.	"Baby's Back Again"	Robinson	2:19
10.	"Let Me Help You Work It Out"	Foster	2:19
11.	"Between Each Tear"	Frazier	2:39
12.	"There Are Some Things"	Anderson; Hayes	3:00

== Personnel ==
All credits are adapted from the liner notes of I Love Charley Brown, the biography booklet by Colin Escott titled Born to Sing and the biography booklet by Barry Mazor titled Just for What I Am.

Musical personnel

- Brenton Banks – violin
- Byron Bach – cello
- Howard Carpenter – viola
- Jerry Carrigan – drums
- Dorothy Dillard – background vocals
- Ray Edenton – guitar
- Dolores Edgin – background vocals
- Solie Fott – viola
- Johnny Gimble – fiddle
- Buddy Harman – drums
- Lillian Hunt – violin
- Roy Huskey – bass
- John Kline – viola
- Shelly Kurland – violin
- Piere Menard – violin
- Wayne Moss – bass guitar, guitar
- Weldon Myrick – steel guitar
- Priscilla Hubbard – background vocals
- Dean Porter – guitar
- Hargus "Pig" Robbins – piano
- Connie Smith – lead vocals
- Leo Taylor – drums
- Gary Vanosdale – viola
- Bill Walker – vibes
- Lamar Watkins – guitar
- Bill Wright – background vocals
- Harvey Wolfe – cello

Technical personnel

- Bob Ferguson – Producer
- Dallas Frazier – Liner notes
- Jim Malloy – Engineer
- Tom Pick – Engineer
- Bill Vandevort – Engineer
- Bill Walker – Arranger, conductor

== Chart performance ==
Chart (1968)	Peak position
US Top Country Albums (Billboard)	14

== Release history ==
Region	Date	Format	Label	Ref.
North America	April 1968	Vinyl	RCA Victor Records	
North America	2010s	Music download; streaming	Sony Music Entertainment	
