= Silent Prey =

Silent Prey is the title of:

- Silent Prey (1992) a mystery book by John Sandford
- Silent Prey (1997) a direct-to-video film starring Carol Shaya
