= Oddville, MTV =

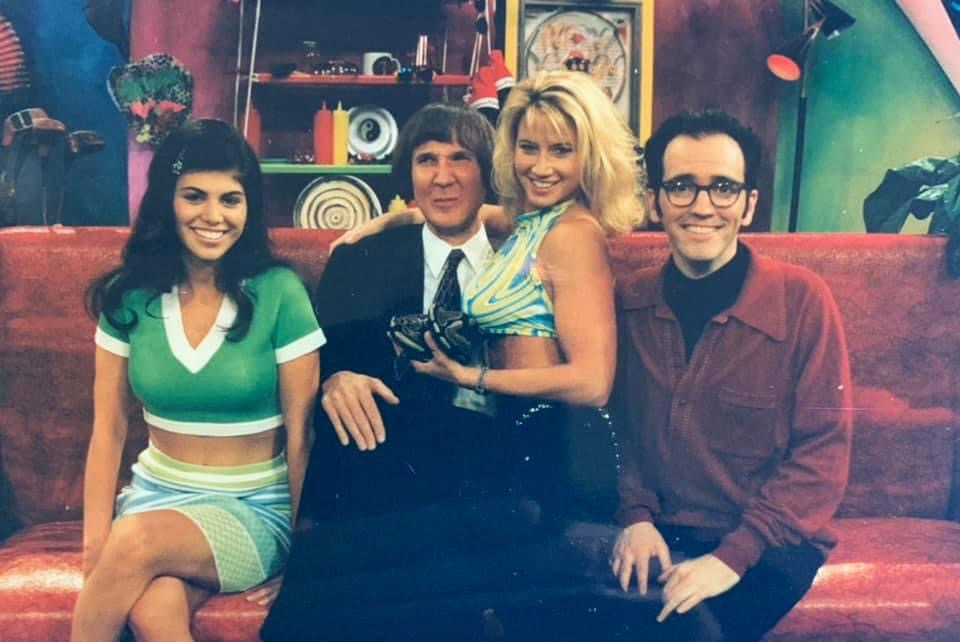
- Oddville, MTV announcer Melissa Gabriel, co-host David Greene, guest WWE's Sunny, host Frank Hope
- Genre: Comedy
- Directed by: Kit Carson
- Starring: Rich Brown (as Frank Hope)
- Country of origin: United States
- Original language: English
- No. of seasons: 1
- No. of episodes: 66

Production
- Executive producer: Jeremiah Bosgang
- Producer: Rich Brown
- Production location: New York City
- Running time: 22 minutes

Original release
- Network: MTV
- Release: June 16 – October 31, 1997

Related
- Beyond Vaudeville (1987–1996)

Oddville, MTV is an American variety television series starring Rich Brown (as host Frank Hope), co-host David Greene, and announcer Melissa Gabriel. The series premiered June 16, 1997, on MTV.

== History ==
Oddville, MTV was based on the New York City public-access television series Beyond Vaudeville that Rich Brown hosted (as Frank Hope) and David Greene co-hosted from 1987 to 1996. Like before, the background puppets and Joey the Dancing Monkey appear again, with Joey having an updated look and only showing up during the musical segments without being called to the stage. Beyond Vaudeville director Steve Korn served as a creative consultant on the series.

== Cast ==
- Rich Brown as host Frank Hope
- David Greene as silent co-host David
- Melissa Gabriel as the announcer
- John Walsh as Joey the Dancing Monkey

Each episode featured a celebrity guest, approximately six eccentric or uniquely talented guests, and a guest band.

== Reception ==
Phil Gallo of Variety described the show as "'stupid human tricks' on methamphetamines as one act after another is whisked to the floor to perform before hitting the couch for a few questions". Gallo went on to describe Hope as having "an Everyman quality possessed by TV hosts from [Joe] Franklin to Uncle Floyd to Colin Malone", and said that announcer Gabriel has "a warm and enchanting presence".

== Episodes ==
Episode	Air Date	Celebrity Guest	Featured Guests	Musical Guests
101	June 12, 1997	Stephen Baldwin	Haley the Human Bowling Ball; Jimmy Del Rio; The Fiery Diana Kiefer; Danny the Wonder Pony; Fred "Rooty Toot" Doot	Orbit (American band)
102	June 16, 1997	Doug E. Doug	The Fan-tastic Jason Gerb; Fruity Nutcake; Microman Sean Boggs; Leonard "Old Mother Hubbard" Sragow; The Amazing Feets of Jaki	Los Straitjackets
103	June 17, 1997	Kellie Shanygne Williams	The Footloose Adam Rothman, Izzy Fertel, Human Abacus Bob Yang, Mail Vocalist Stryker, Asaari's Doggie Doings	OMC (band)
104	June 18, 1997	Andy Dick	Drag King Dred, James Delise Tongue Tricks, Funnyman Neil Connie Wallace, Human Piggybank Josh Weisbrot, Belcher Laura Vichroski	Jill Sobule
105	June 19, 1997	Kendall Gill	Kamchik the Singing Cowboy, Pauly's Marshmallow Mania, Pretzel Girl Leslie Liebling, Coco & Penny, Young Yeller Ken Tufo	Chavez (band)
106	June 20, 1997	Eric Schaeffer	Richard Bush & His Stomach of Steel, Suzanne Muldowney, Closed Mouth Kimberly Conlon, Moses Josiah & His Musical Saw, Ten Cents-ation Rob DeFalco	Tonic
107	June 23, 1997	Michael Michele	Escape Artist Da 7 Devine, The Seasoned Swingers, Burp Master Ryan McCormick, Funnyman Jackie Jayson Exit, Suzanne the Dolphin Girl	Hanson
108	June 24, 1997	Kenny Anderson	Sayed the Whirling Dervish, Toe-rific Cheryl Romero, Nosy Jim Grosso & His Sister Louise, Body Beautiful Tucker Farrar, Chad the Velociraptor	BR5-49
109	June 25, 1997	Kevin Smith, Joey Lauren Adams	The Legendary Benny Bell, Tattooed Dancer Clare Ann Matz, Human Pincushion Eric Ziobrowski, The Amazing Steve and Alex Max, Courtney the Seagull Girl	King Changó
110	June 26, 1997	Donald Faison	Human Electro Beatbox Masai Green, Freddy Schuman, Bendable Ashley Doran, Daredevil Ron Star, Louis The Levitator Somma	Robert Bradley's Blackwater Surprise
111	June 27, 1997	Joe Barbara	Balloonists Stephanie & Keith, Arthur of New York, Pretzel Boy Samuel Greenfeld, Radio-active Steven Scott, Raven's Fowl Play	K's Choice
112	June 30, 1997	Frank Whaley	Painproof Rubber Girls, Florence Miller Dancers, Belcher Bryan Kelly, Bicep Soloist Paul Shields, Contortionist Kristen Kellog	The Lemonheads
113	July 1, 1997	Taylor Negron	Lightbulb Eater Chris Allison, Rabbi Henry Katz, One-Hand Clapper Jason Rossi, Gloria and Babydoll Gibson, Head Banger Rafael McDonald	Cibo Matto
114	July 2, 1997	Darrell Hammond	Animal Cracker Expert William Peregine, Sci-Fi Siren Roberta Rogow (filk music), Handwrestler Nassim Ajami, Pied Piper Herb Bloom, Cat noises by James Cayo	The Cunninghams
115	July 3, 1997	Matt Pinfield	Sticky students Chris & Shane & Jen & Tom, Shepard and Jourdan, Grape Catcher Ian McGrady, Eugene the Human Doormat, Reservoir Rob Esris	Big Ass Truck
116	July 4, 1997	Jerry O'Connell	Jon Murray and His Chris Walken Arms, Nicole Pinto and her accordion, Keith Conrade Smokes out Ear, Arthur Grundig & Maria, Ashley Curtis the human car alarm	Bloodhound Gang
117	July 7, 1997	Rider Strong	Mr. Phil & Son, Bettina the Ugly Face, Gregg Goldin's Write Stuff, Hangin’ with Brett Burton, Stacy's Tip Top Tap	Sloan
118	July 8, 1997	Alan Cumming	Wonder Women Erinna & Hedre, Mark Clemente and the Magical Tongue, Fredi Dundee and Angus, Wayne Ooh La La Lammers, The Knee-dy Justin Priolo	Stubborn All-Stars
119	July 9, 1997	Adam Wylie	Dancer Julio Diaz, Joanna Iron Jaw Leban, Bingo Gazingo, Cubist Abe Mittleman, Barker Marigo	Jon Spencer Blues Explosion
120	July 10, 1997	Joe Pantoliano	Condom Head Dan Lipper, B. J. Snowden, Andrew Fleming and His Musical Teeth, Funnyman Neil Connie Wallace, Facial Seamstress Maria Evangelatos	Komeda
121	July 11, 1997	Dave Attell	Feminist Izzy Fertel, Moses Josiah & His Musical Saw, Rigid Reiko, Up and Combing Eleana Reynoso, Blastmaster Drew	Papas Fritas
122	July 14, 1997	Kurt Loder	Tattooed Tunesmith Clyde Forsman, “Nostril Thrills with Demetrious,” Judy's Bear Feat, Baby Sharen, Eli Rarey	The Toasters
123	July 15, 1997	Sheryl Lee Ralph	Horny Drum Tribe, Red Mascara, Katie's Write Face, Naughty Annie Berman, Thu Le	Sugar Ray
124	July 16, 1997	Peta Wilson	Grant Stiles and his Bee Beard, The Psychic World of Cassandra, Jabberjaw Sean Hanzok, Powerful Pete Traina, Tim's Monkey Business	Fun Lovin' Criminals
125	July 17, 1997	Georgianna Robertson	Ripplin' Rob Aloi, Dr. Sue Horowitz, The Unfiltered Adam Rothman, Human Playground Dave Ladson, Sonya the Seagull Girl	Ween
126	July 18, 1997	Victoria Silvstedt	Greg's World of Sound, Doctor McGougain, Blading Beauty Judy Meyers, Elizabeth Tashjian, The Disarming Emily Harder	Skeleton Key (band)
127	July 21, 1997	Mary Lynn Rajskub	Prince Cortes of the Philippines, Akim of the Lotus Collective, The Striking Nayeem Mian Siddique, “Human Zoo” Emren Alev, Lickin’ Lukic	Madder Rose
128	July 22, 1997	Rhonda Ross Kendrick, Natalia Paruz	The Sole-Full Leigh Foster, Chairman Steve, John Johnson & Axe Capoeira, Ab-solutely Mario Bruno	Vibrolush
129	July 23, 1997	Scott Bairstow, Maurice Catarcio	Tara DeLong the Closed-Mouth Singer, Jimmy Del Rio, “The A-Peel-ing” Michael Schleigh	Rollins Band
130	July 24, 1997	Shaun Baker	Miss Rhea Roma, Bubbly Rhonda Farmer, Micah's Belly Laffs, Fruity Nutcake, “Squeaky” Thomas Mancusi,	Claw Hammer
131	July 25, 1997	Dom Irrera	The Uncanny Nisan Banin, Azza & Sira & Monica & Shahira, The Comic Stylings of Gary Allen, Reversible Dave Shaffer	Coward
132	July 28, 1997	Jocelyn Seagrave	Wally the Pig, The Legendary Benny Bell, Danglin' Steve Belledin, Eunjin Hwang, “Tapehead” Olivia Ward	Reel Big Fish
133	July 29, 1997	Rhonda Shear	The Swell Zenon Pimentel, Gloria & Baby Doll Gibson, Jugglin' Josh Weiner, Matt Fogelman, Gene's Pool	Thin Lizard Dawn
134	July 30, 1997	Jessica Biel	Coin Operator Jaymes Hodges, Dachsund Friendship Club, “Bend Over” Ben Binford, Andy's Chicken Delight, Holey Lori Sapp	That Dog
135	July 31, 1997	Nicholas Turturro	Shakin' Ollie Shasta, Wiry Yana Toyber, “The Ass-tounding” Peter Russo, Flipping Out with James, Auslender the Rib Bender	MxPx
136	August 1, 1997	Chris Spencer	B. J. Snowden, Muscleman Maurice Catarcio, Adnilem Gnitzel, Jason's Effervescence	The Pulsars
137	August 4, 1997	Kenan Thompson & Kel Mitchell	Izzy Fertel, Michael Mahoney Uncaged, Alan's Hand-Jive, Anne's Heads and Tales, Arc de Ronit	The Frogs (band)
138	August 5, 1997	None	Viewer email, Mr. Spoons, Jessie Flo & Willie Sue The Busers, Star Spangled Struttin' with Paul Amerika, Naughty Annie Berman, “Human Bagpipe” Lucas Crane	Daniel Cartier
139	August 6, 1997	Stacy Ferguson & Renee Sandstrom & Stefanie Ridel	“Human Clothesline” Jeremy Graham, Interpretive Dancer Suzanne Muldowney, Jason Spirit the Birdman of Brooklyn, Rossabella Thornbloom, Yumpin' Yetter	Wild Orchid
140	August 7, 1997	Edd Hall	“The Well-Balanced” Michael Jarosz, Richard Bush and His Stomach of Steel, Heather Zigzag Marell, “Jokin' John” Mobilio, Marchitelli's March	Souls (band)
141	August 8, 1997	Nicole Sullivan, Jerome Benton	Mr. Phil, Mike “Sock it to Me” Alltmont, Nasal Linguist Jeff Jones, Meowin' Monica and Pumpkin	Space
142	August 11, 1997	Nadia Dajani	Derrick Nowlin's Palms of Steel, Bingo Gazingo & The 8th Grade, Scott & Ray the Motion Explosion, Gypsy's Funky Fingers, Gabriel's Forget-Me-Knots	Bis (Scottish band)
143	August 13, 1997	Kathy Griffin	Double Dutch Divas, Jeff Bartlett's Nervy Nostrils, Stanless Steel, Tony Oh My Goth Sarinopoulos, In-Fantastic Carmen & Nisida Spera	Blink-182
144	August 14, 1997	Hill Harper	Valerie Galloway & Richie, Cinder-Fellas Jose & Arturo, Roland Moussa's UFO Toy, The Cross-Eyed Fourniers	Our Lady Peace
145	August 15, 1997	Engelbert Humperdinck	Neptune & Bubbles, Barry the Human Cherry Tree, The Allure of Kerima, Stuart Rudin's Reptilian Rap, Crybaby Jeanine Moss	Cool for August
146	August 18, 1997	Connie Britton	Jumpin & Hoppin & Climbin with Alex n Lazer, Mr. Hand Man, The New Fangled Sebastian Todd, Tongue-tied Jim, Major William Best	The O.C. Supertones
147	August 19, 1997	Guillermo Diaz	Pedalectric Libor Karas, The Clockworks Experimental Puppetry Theatre, Joe's Multiplication Madness, Betty Aberlin, Alice Tzou and Her Pipa	Jimmie's Chicken Shack
148	August 20, 1997	Scott Thompson	Jumpin Mark Odgers, Ron Valdes' Chain Reaction, Yuma and The Culture Exchange, Musique de Dominique, Lyons' Roar	The Honeyrods
149	August 21, 1997	Sam Sarpong	Yo-Yo Master John Freeborn, Stanless Steel, Samba Cumina Samba, Shay Magnifique	Descendents
150	August 22, 1997	Denise Austin	The Fishy Antonio DaSliva, Kathleen's Amazing Buttocks, Alan “Hotfoot” Gabay	Bradford Reed, Treble Charger
151	August 25, 1997	Todd Barry	Hip Pickles, Cinder-fellas Jose & Arturo, Fortune Fun with Kate, Tom Tricky Pinky Lally	Radish (band)
152	August 27, 1997	Matt Malloy	Human Place Setting Scott Baker, Catherine and her Broomstick, The Wizard of Vase, Larry's Bicuspid Beat, Travis “Pyro Puss” Goldstein	Local H
153	August 28, 1997	None	White House Wonders Nick & Joe, Toolin' Around with Natalia Paruz, Dean Street Field of Operation, Crackin' Up with Adam Rothman, Cubist Abe Mittleman, Sarwar Khan	Camp Lo
154	August 29, 1997	The Public Enemy (professional wrestling)	The Belly Boys, Mighty Mike Lane, Tarik's Moroccan Magic, The Leg-endary Dan & Noa, The Eye-popping Max Kuperman	The Dambuilders
155	September 1, 1997	Nancy Giles	Stanless Steel, Morris Katz, Shock-a-Lock, Sarah's Mannequinetics, The Inflatable Chelsea Thompson	ManBREAK
156	September 2, 1997	Louis C.K.	The Barber of Oddville, Ken's Unique Physique, Steinfeld, Human Corkscrew Dennis Parente, Countess Kelly Jordan	FAT (band)
157	September 5, 1997	Tammy "Sunny" Sytch, WWE Wrestler	Scott's Prophylactic Proboscis, The Human Shopping Cart, Mike's Canine Canopy, The Un-Bubble-lievable Thomas Bresadora	Smash Mouth
158	September 8, 1997	Janet Gunn	Goin' Bananas with Marty, Barflies Jose & Arturo, Steady Rob Steen, Joe Papa, Aaron O'Lantern	Del Amitri
159	September 9, 1997	Devon Sawa	Arnold's Monstrous Makeover, The Multi-talented Dougie Rosenkrantz, Cha Cha King & Queen Sparky & Fae, Dr. Stanley Taub & Lois, Terror-ific April Richardson	Morphine (band)
160	September 10, 1997	"Weird Al" Yankovic	Mike “The Muncher” DeVito, Tiny Yarborough, Grass Man Adam Mauksch, Yelena's Dance Fever, Dan's Lively Lips	GusGus
161	September 11, 1997	Leon	The Seasoned Swingers, Wrasslin' Nassim Ajami, Sasha's Sax Appeal, The Jaw-dropping Penny DiMarco, Heart to Heart with James	Fountains of Wayne
162	September 12, 1997	Randy & Jason Sklar	The Incredible Likeness of Baker, Maat, Weldon's Cheep Thrills, Cutlery Cut-Up Brian McDonald, Nipple Tricks with Joe & Eric	Camus (musician)
163	September 15, 1997	Chris Ferraro & Peter Ferraro	Anthony's Feet of Steel, Hip-Hoop-Hooray with Tatiana, The Twisted Michael Malavarca, Miss Tammy Sue Buser, Jenna and her Motor Tongue	Cowboy Mouth
164	September 16, 1997	Anthony Barrile	Bouncy Ella & Inna & Regina, Nigerian Poetess Ayodele, Funky Phil and his Friend Larry, The Comic Stylings of Gary Allen, Kristina's Musical Throat	Guided by Voices
165	September 17, 1997	Dominique Dawes	Roger's Mini Masterpieces, Human Trumpet Glenn Miller, Serene, Arthur Glass Kicker	Bettie Serveert
166	October 31, 1997	Special Episode: “A Very Oddville Wedding” with Michael Boatman, Phil Dejean, and Cinnamon	Freddy Schuman, Suzanne Muldowney, Izzy Fertel, Scott Baker, Daniel Lipper, Ripplin Rob Aloi, Burpmaster Ryan McCormick, Natalia Paruz, Bruce Gaston (musician), Rigid Reiko, Eva Veronica Klein	Teenage Fanclub
