= Brackenridge High School =

Location
- 400 Eagleland Street; San Antonio, Bexar County, Texas 78210; United States; 29.405395°N 98.487604°W

Information
- Former name: Phillis Wheatley High School (1974–1988)
- School type: Public, high school
- Established: 1917
- Locale: City: Large
- School district: San Antonio ISD
- Superintendent: Pedro Martinez
- NCES School ID: 483873004407
- Principal: Mandie Holtsford-Suarez
- Faculty: 102.0 (on an FTE basis)
- Grades: 9–12
- Enrollment: 1,568 (2022–2023)
- Student to teacher ratio: 15.37
- Colors: Purple, gold, and white
- Athletics conference: UIL Class 5A
- Team name: Mighty Eagles
- Website: Official Website

G.W. Brackenridge High School is a public high school located in central San Antonio, Texas, and classified as a 5A school by the University Interscholastic League (UIL). This school is one of 12 high schools in the San Antonio Independent School District. During 2022–2023, Brackenridge High School had an enrollment of 1,568 students and a student to teacher ratio of 15.37. The school received an overall rating of "B" from the Texas Education Agency for the 2024–2025 school year. It was formerly known as Phillis Wheatley High School.

== History ==
The school was founded in 1917 on the city's south side along the San Antonio River near the King William neighborhood. It was named for George Washington Brackenridge. The original three-story brick structure was demolished and replaced with today's shorter, more sprawling structure in 1974. That year, the school was renamed in honor of Phillis Wheatley, the first published African-American poet, a woman taken in childhood from West Africa, enslaved and taken to Boston, and eventually freed. In 1988, bowing to some alumni concerns, the school's original name was restored.

== Athletics ==
The Brackenridge Mighty Eagles compete in the following sports:

- Baseball
- Basketball
- Cross Country
- Football
- Golf
- Soccer
- Softball
- Swimming and Diving
- Tennis
- Track and Field
- Volleyball
- Cheerleading
- Marching Band

=== Football ===
- 1947 State Champions - Defeated Highland Park 21–13. This was the last title before the UIL divided schools into classifications based on enrollment.
- 1962 State Champions-Defeated Borger High School 30–26.

=== Soccer ===
- 2018 District Champions-Defeated their rivals Highlands High School 2–1 in the final game of the season

== Notable alumni ==
- Kenneth Nelson (Class of 1947) — American actor
- Robert Cade (Class of 1945) — leader of the research team that created the sports drink Gatorade
- Jim Harrison (Class of 1967) — Former NFL running back
- Weldon Humble (Class of 1938) — Former NFL offensive guard
- Sam Hurd (Class of 2002) — Former NFL wide receiver
- Warren McVea (Class of 1964) — Former NFL running back
- John Quiñones (Class of 1970) — ABC News co-anchor and host of What Would You Do?
- Rudolf Staffel — ceramistl, educator
- Doris Drew (born Doris Gruen), singer
