= Bingo Gazingo =

Murray Wachs (June 2, 1924 – January 1, 2010), better known as Bingo Gazingo, was a poet from New York City, who was a postal worker for most of his career. Two versions, each also titled Bingo Gazingo, were released of the only single-artist album ever released by WFMU—the first on cassette, the second on CD. (Among other changes, the CD replaced Ravel's Boléro with an improvised bolero as accompaniment to "Bingo's Bolero".) Bingo's parents were big fans of the game of Bingo, which resulted in him getting his notable name.

== Career ==
The album consists of Bingo's reading his poems to an improvised musical accompaniment by WFMU DJs R. Stevie Moore, Bob Brainen, Dennis Diken, Dave Amels, Chris Bolger and Chris Butler, and engineered by Amels. Often, while performing live, the background music to his frantic, poetic incantations is nothing more than a cassette tape inserted into a cheap cigar-box tape recorder and miked.

Bingo's poetry often contains complicated rhyme schemes, extended stream-of-consciousness rambling, and crude language, with titles like "Up Your Jurassic Park" and "I Love You So Fucking Much I Can't Shit". He penned hyper-caffeinated odes to Madonna, Tupac Shakur, and Beavis and Butthead, and had his "Everything's O.K. at the O.K. Corral" (a dreamy reminiscence of the cowboy movie serials by an old nurse-attended man) featured on a 1996 CD produced by the famed Greenwich Village coffeehouse Fast Folk Cafe.

Bingo was accompanied and interpreted by My Robot Friend performing his "You're Out of the Computer" at the Outsider Music Festival at Time Cafe (downstairs from Fez) in New York City and, according to what My Robot Friend said there, also at appearances in Europe.

Bingo would always introduce NYC band Crambone when they would play at local downtown clubs like CBGB's, Arlene's Grocery, Baby Jupiter, The Continental, The Mercury Lounge and other New York venues. His image appeared on Crambone's breakout CD "Go Getcha Shinebox" in 2001.

Bingo Gazingo recorded for GRANDGOOD in May 2003 in Centerport, Long Island. Versions of 'Everyday I Leave $10 On The Table', 'J-Lo', and 'OK Corral' were recorded. 'Everynight Man', 'Old Man River', and 'Freey Zeeky' were also recorded.

Bingo in 1997 made his MTV debut on the show Oddville, MTV and wound up appearing twice on the series. He also appeared twice on the New York City public access television series Beyond Vaudeville in 1996 and 1997.

Born in Queens in 1924, Bingo Gazingo wrote music for most of his life, struggling on the edge of obscurity. He continued to actively write, record and perform perverse, edgy music until the day he died (New Year's Day 2010) at 85 years old, struck down by a cab on his way to perform at the Bowery Poetry Club.

Prior to his death. Bingo performed every Monday night, at 6:00 PM, at the Bowery Poetry Club in New York City.

== Filmography ==
- Kiss Loves You (2007)

== Bibliography ==
- (2003). "". villagevoice.com. Retrieved September 9.
- Kennedy, Randy (January 5, 1997). "The Ballads of Bingo Gazingo". The New York Times.
