= Weldon Humble =

American football player (1921–1998)

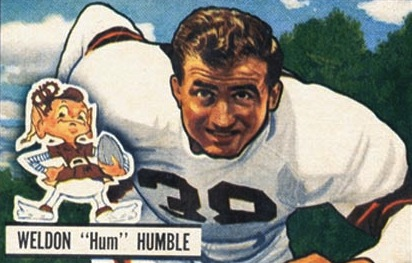
- Humble on a 1951 football card

No. 38, 66
- Position: Guard

Personal information
- Born: April 24, 1921; Nixon, Texas, U.S.
- Died: April 14, 1998 (aged 76); Houston, Texas, U.S.
- Listed height: 6 ft 1 in (1.85 m)
- Listed weight: 221 lb (100 kg)

Career information
- High school: Brackenridge (San Antonio, Texas)
- College: Rice (1941-1942, 1946); Louisiana (1943)
- NFL draft: 1943: 24th round, 224th overall pick

Career history
- Cleveland Browns (1947-1950); Dallas Texans (1952)

Awards and highlights
- NFL champion (1950); 3× AAFC champion (1947, 1948, 1949); Second-team All-Pro (1948); Pro Bowl (1950); Consensus All-American (1946); 2× First-team All-SWC (1942, 1946); 50th anniversary All-Southwest Conf. (1968); Texas Sports Hall of Fame (1969); South Texas Football Hall of Fame (1969); Rice University Athletics Hall of Fame (1970)

Career NFL/AAFC statistics
- Games played: 58
- Games started: 30
- Interceptions: 5
- Stats at Pro Football Reference
- College Football Hall of Fame

Weldon Gaston "Hum" Humble (April 24, 1921 – April 14, 1998) was an American professional football player who was a guard for five seasons in the All-America Football Conference (AAFC) and National Football League (NFL) for the Cleveland Browns and Dallas Texans in the late 1940s and early 1950s.

Humble grew up in Texas and was a multi-sport athlete at Brackenridge High School in San Antonio. He enrolled at Rice University in Houston, Texas in 1940 and played three seasons on the school's football team. Humble then spent three years in the U.S. Marines during World War II, serving in the Pacific War and earning a Bronze Star Medal before returning to complete his college studies in 1946. Sportswriters named him a first-team All-American after the Rice Owls finished with an 8–2 win–loss record and beat Tennessee 8–0 in the 1947 Orange Bowl.

The AAFC's Baltimore Colts signed Humble in 1947, but the Browns acquired him in a trade before the season. Humble became an anchor on Cleveland's offensive line, helping the team win three straight AAFC titles in the late 1940s. When the AAFC dissolved in 1949, Cleveland moved to the NFL and won another championship in 1950. Humble, who remained in the Marine Reserves, was called into service in the Korean War after the season. He was expected to return to Cleveland the following year, but head coach Paul Brown traded him to the Texans before the 1952 season began. He retired after one year in Dallas.

After his playing career, Humble worked as a bank executive and at an office supply company. He was also the chairman of the selection committee for the Bluebonnet Bowl. Humble was inducted into the College Football Hall of Fame in 1961, and was named to the Texas Sports Hall of Fame and the South Texas Football Hall of Fame in 1969. He is also a member of the Rice University Athletics Hall of Fame. He died in 1998 in Houston following a long illness.

== Early life and college career ==
Humble was born in Nixon, Texas, a suburb of San Antonio, in 1921. His athletic career began at San Antonio's Brackenridge High School. Humble played as an end for two seasons and a fullback for a third season on the football team. He also played on the basketball, track and swimming teams before graduating and enrolling at Rice University in Houston, Texas in 1940.

Humble began play on Rice's freshman team as an end in 1940. He advanced to the varsity team the next year. While he started as an end, coach Jess Neely switched him to guard before the first game of the season. He thrived in the new position, and was named a sophomore all-star by the Associated Press after the Rice Owls finished 1941 with a 6–3–1 win–loss–tie record. The following year, Humble earned All-Southwest Conference honors and won the George Martin Award, given to Rice's most valuable player, as Rice put up a 7–2–1 record.

Humble left Rice in 1943 for the University of Louisiana at Lafayette, then called Southwestern Louisiana Institute, to prepare for service in World War II in a V-12 U.S. Navy training program. As he trained, he played alongside enlistees from Tulane University, the University of Tulsa and Louisiana State University on a military team that won six straight games and was selected to play in the first Oil Bowl in Houston. Captained by Humble, Southwestern beat a service team from Randolph Air Force Base in San Antonio. Halfback Alvin Dark loved playing behind Humble, recalling years later that "I'd never seen such blocking."

After the season, Humble enlisted in the United States Marine Corps and was sent to fight in the Pacific War. He rose to the rank of first lieutenant and won a Bronze Star Medal. Upon his discharge in 1946, Humble returned to Rice. He lettered in football and track and field and was voted a consensus first-team All-American guard while captain of Rice's Southwest Conference co-champion team. He was also named lineman of the week by the Associated Press in November for his strong tackling in a game against the Texas A&M Aggies. After finishing with an 8–2 record, Rice beat Tennessee in the Orange Bowl game in early 1947. Rice was ranked the 10th-best college team in the nation in the AP Poll.

== Professional football career ==
Paul Brown, the coach of the Cleveland Browns in the All-America Football Conference (AAFC), met Humble while vacationing in Florida in 1946. Brown came to watch the Orange Bowl on New Year's Day, and was staying in the same hotel as the Rice team. He saw Humble and his wife Lorraine, whom Humble had met while in training at Southwestern, on a dance floor at the hotel. "He appeared to be the sort of fellow we like to have on our team," Brown said later in 1947. "Then I watched him in that Tennessee game and after that made up my mind he'd be with my club if I ever had the chance to make a deal for him." The AAFC's Baltimore Colts selected Humble in the league's draft, but Brown got his chance in August. He engineered a trade that sent four players including quarterback Steve Nemeth and guard George Cheroke to the Colts, plus two players to be named later.

Before joining the Browns, Humble played in the College All-Star Game, a now-defunct annual matchup between the National Football League (NFL) champion and a selection of the best college players from around the country. The college all-stars won the game, defeating the Chicago Bears 16–0. In Cleveland, Humble was part of an offensive line that included Lin Houston, Ed Ulinski and Bob Gaudio. Their job was to protect quarterback Otto Graham from opposing defenders and open up running room for fullback Marion Motley. They chanted "nobody touches Graham" when they broke the huddle.

Helped by strong line play, Graham, Motley and Cleveland ends Dante Lavelli and Mac Speedie led a potent offense that dominated the AAFC for three years. The Browns won the AAFC championship in 1947, 1948 and 1949 before the league disbanded and Cleveland was absorbed by the more established NFL. Humble was a consensus second-team All-Pro selection in 1948, when Cleveland won all of its games. Cleveland's success continued in the NFL in 1950, when Humble was used on occasion as a linebacker on defense. The Browns finished the season with a 10–2 record and beat the Los Angeles Rams in the NFL championship game. Humble was selected to play in the first-ever Pro Bowl, the NFL's all-star game.

Humble continued as a member of the Marine Reserves as his professional career continued, and in 1951 he was in danger of being called up for service in the Korean War. He re-enlisted in the summer and played for a military team at Marine Corps Base Quantico later in the year. After the season, he was named the best service player in the country by the Washington Touchdown Club.

Humble was expected to return to the Browns after his discharge from the military in 1952. In a surprise move, however, Brown traded him before the season to the Dallas Texans for fullback Sherman Howard. The trade was unexpected because Cleveland's other guards, including Gaudio and Alex Agase, were getting older and nearing retirement. "I'm sure we'll be all right at the guard position," Brown said at the time. "But we do have a definite fullback problem." Humble played one season for the Texans before retiring. Dallas had a 1–11 record in 1952.

== Later life and death ==
After his football career, Humble worked for 20 years at First City National Bank in Houston. He later became vice-president of an office supply firm called Stationers, Inc. He maintained an affiliation with his Texas alma mater, serving as president and later director of the R Association, an alumni group for former Rice student-athletes. In the late 1960s, he became the president of the Greater Houston Bowl Association, which organized the Bluebonnet Bowl. By the mid-1970s, he was chairman of the Bowl's selection committee.

Humble won numerous honors after his career. He became the first Rice player inducted into the College Football Hall of Fame in 1961. He was included on a 50th anniversary All-Southwest Conference team in 1968, and in 1970 was one of the first people inducted into the Rice University Athletics Hall of Fame. Humble was inducted into the Texas Sports Hall of Fame and the South Texas Football Hall of Fame in 1969.

Later in life, Humble worked for the Harris County Appraisal Review Board and was a salesman for an office furniture supply company. He died in 1998 in Houston after a long illness. Humble and his wife Lorraine had three children.
