= Doris Drew =

American former singer (born 1927)

Doris Drew (born Doris Gruen; August 23, 1927) is an American former singer who performed on radio, television, and records and in personal appearances.

== Early years ==
Drew (born Doris Gruen on August 23, 1927) was born and raised in San Antonio, Texas. People became aware of her singing ability by the time she was 8 years old, and she performed in many school programs. Drew grew up in a musically oriented environment, with her mother being a pianist and both brothers interested in music. As early as age 4 she experienced weekends when musicians came for what she described as "open house for San Antonio's musicmakers"; her brothers and their guests were "all stomping out a jazz tempo ... and my little 4-year-old foot stomping in time along with them." After Drew's father died when she was young, she lived with various uncles and aunts who had ranches in the area and enjoyed the outdoor activities available on those ranches.

In 1946 she was a social hostess for the USO at Kelly Field when a band needed a singer. She volunteered, and success resulted. Her first professional booking came after she graduated from Brackenridge High School. After singing locally with Pete Brewer and Henry Sheldon she moved to California. There she lived with her brother, musician Henry Gruen,) and worked as a secretary while she sought opportunities to advance her musical career. Because her agent did not like her birth name, she said, "I knew I'd have to change it. One night, just as I was about to sing, he handed me a slip of paper with 'Doris Drew' written on it."

== Career ==
Based in California, Drew sang in clubs and made personal appearances in and around Los Angeles. Her career gained momentum when she won a vocal contest sponsored by singer Frankie Laine and some disc jockeys in California. Her selection from among 500 contestants resulted in a week-long engagement for her to sing at the Million Dollar Theatre in Hollywood with Laine as the headliner. A review of Drew's performance said: "In her stage debut yesterday, even though a little frightened, she exhibited a pleasing, warm and gracious personality. Her voice has exceptional quality. She handles both "Boogie Blues" and "How High the Moon" with finesse." Producer Milton H. Bren signed Drew to appear in the film Borderline (1950) after he heard her perform in a nightclub in Hollywood.

Her performances at the Million Dollar Theatre led to a contract with MGM Records, signed in April 1949. One of those recordings was "The Wedding Samba" with Ziggy Elman's orchestra. Other outcomes of her week at the theatre included an engagement at Ciro's nightclub and a personal-appearance tour in the eastern United States and parts of Canada. During a post-tour stop in Chicago she was a guest on local radio and television programs and made a guest appearance on the Johnny Desmond Goes to College network program. That performance earned her a return visit the next week, after which she was made a permanent cast member.

In February 1951 Drew signed with Mercury Records. Her personal appearances included performing in venues in Cincinnati, New Orleans, Los Angeles, San Francisco, Montreal, and Kansas City.

Drew co-starred with Bill Snary in Dreamboat, a 30-minute program that debuted on April 9, 1951, and was carried on ABC Radio. She was the featured vocalist on Jack Carson's Tuesday-Friday radio program that debuted on July 6, 1954, on CBS, and she sang on the Tennessee Ernie Show Monday-Friday television program that debuted on January 3, 1955, sharing vocal duties with Molly Bee. She subsequently joined the cast of Ford's Monday-Friday evenings program of the same name on CBS Radio. The Ford-Drew connection was resumed in 1958 when the Ford Road Show debuted on CBS Radio. Drew and Bee alternated as the featured female vocalists on the weekday afternoon program. Drew was a member of the cast of the ABC-TV program Music for Fun, which debuted on April 18, 1959.

In 1966 Drew (credited as Doris Drew Allen) provided the singing voice of the title character in ABC-TV's animated special Alice in Wonderland or What's a Nice Kid Like You Doing in a Place Like This?. (Janet Waldo voiced Alice's speaking parts.) She reprised that role for a record album based on the show.

== Personal life ==
Drew married Al Leibovitz, a comedian known professionally as Larry Allen, in Chicago in 1951. They had a son.

In August 2026, Drew celebrated her 99th birthday.

== Critical response ==
When the trade publication Billboard reviewed Drew's performance in the Empire Room of the Schroeder Hotel in Milwaukee on May 15, 1951, it said, "Easy to stare at and beautifully gowned, she does a stand-out job of song selling and projection." The review said that Drew was "fairly well known" to record buyers but did not attract the Empire Room's typical customers. It suggested that "something added in the line of special material" would improve her act.

Billboard's review of the premiere of the radio program Dreamboat said, "Doris Drew sounded lush enough vocally, but the gal's speaking voice was mush-mouthed, shrill and over-animated."

== Partial discography ==
=== 1949 ===
- "A Rose Was a Rose"/"Bargain Day" (MGM 10449)
- "Billy"/"I Wish I Was Back in My Baby's Arms" (MGM 10563) with the Jud Conlon Quintette and Earle Hagen's orchestra

=== 1950 ===
- "Willya Won'tcha"/"I've Got a Sunday Feeling in My Heart" (MGM 10677) with Russ Case's orchestra

=== 1951 ===
- "Didn't Your Mother Ever Tell Ya' Nothin'?" (Mercury 5657) duet with Bob Connally with Ralph Marterie's orchestra
- "I Wish I Was"/"Where's-A Your House?" (Mercury 5701) with Nook Schreier's orchestra
- "Shut Up"/"Beautiful Brown Eyes" (Mercury 5370) with Lew Douglas's orchestra
- "Somebody Else Is Taking My Place"/"My Sentimental Heart" (Mercury 5626) with Lew Douglas's orchestra
- "Sweet Violets"/"Them There Eyes" (Mercury 5673) with Cliff Parman's orchestra

=== 1953 ===
- "Gumbo Ya Ya"/"Moon Is Blue" (Mercury 70194)
- "Since You Went Away From Me"/"Side by Side" (Mercury 70096) with David Carroll's orchestra

=== 1956 ===
- "Be My Lovin' Baby"/"Abada-Abadu (Kahill 1015)

=== 1958 ===
- "Jack Fascinato Arranges Things" album (Stepheny MF 4004) with The Mellowmen
