= A Lady Named Smith =

Studio album by Connie Smith
- Released: May 1973
- Recorded: January 22 – May 15, 1973
- Studio: Columbia Studio B
- Genre: Country; Countrypolitan
- Label: Columbia Records
- Producer: George Richey

Connie Smith chronology
Love Is the Look You're Looking for (1973)	A Lady Named Smith (1973)	Dream Painter (1973)

Singles from A Lady Named Smith
- 1. "You've Got Me (Right Where You Want Me)" Released: March 1973

A Lady Named Smith is the twentieth solo studio album by American country singer Connie Smith. It was released in May 1973 by Columbia Records, her first album for the label. The production and style featured a string instrumentation to help market Smith in the pop field. Included were a mix of new material and covers of previously recorded songs by other artists. The album's only single was the original tune, "You've Got Me (Right Where You Want Me)", which reached the American country songs chart in 1973. A Lady Named Smith would also chart on the American country albums chart in 1973.

== Background ==
Between 1964 and 1973, Connie Smith was signed to RCA Victor and had eighteen top ten singles. By 1973, Smith had become increasingly dissatisfied with RCA Victor and ultimately left the label after her contract was not altered to her specified needs. Instead, she signed with Columbia Records and was permitted to record one gospel album per year.

At Columbia, she met with executive Clive Davis, who agreed to produce her. However, Columbia dismissed Davis from the label and Smith began working on her first album with producer Billy Sherrill. However, the pair disagreed on religion, Smith being more religious than Sherrill: "The first time we met after I signed, we had an argument. He said 'there was no such thing as sin.' That became an ongoing thing, and part of it was my fault," Smith later reflected. Instead, Billy Sherrill arranged for George Richey to produce Smith's first Columbia album. Richey had recently had success as a songwriter for George Jones and Tammy Wynette. He had also previously produced albums for Dick Curless and Wynn Stewart. Richey would craft Smith's first Columbia disc titled A Lady Named Smith.

== Recording and content ==
The recording process for A Lady Named Smith occurred over the course of four 1973 sessions: January 22, January 23, January 26 and February 2. Four overdub sessions were also added that included string instrumentation. The sessions occurred at Columbia Studio B, located in Nashville, Tennessee. George Richey produced both the original and overdub sessions. Biographer Barry Mazor found the album to be crafted in a "Countrypolitan Sound", that featured a "lush chorus and string embellishments". The sound was created because Columbia believed Smith to have pop potential. Smith herself feared the new pop approach would shy away her fans but agreed to try it because she found "good songs". A Lady Named Smith consisted of 11 tracks. Its opening track, "You've Got Me (Right Where You Want Me)" was co-written by Smith and Richey. "It was a really good songwriting collaboration," Smith recalled in 2021. Another new track was "The House Where Love Shines", which was penned by Smith's friend and songwriter, Dallas Frazier. A third new track was "Love Held on to Me". It was penned by Helen Cornelius, who would later have success as a country music artist.

Several album tracks were covers of previously recorded songs by other artists. Among these recordings was the track "Soul Song", which was penned by George Richey and was a number one country single by Joe Stampley in 1972. Another cover was "Pass Me By (If You're Only Passing Through)", which was first a single by Johnny Rodriguez several months prior to Smith's recording. Rodriguez's version reached the top ten of the American country chart. A third cover was "A Picture of Me (Without You)", which had been a top five country single for George Jones. Smith also covered Don Gibson's "Too Soon to Know", which he first recorded in 1958. "I picked that song because I loved it!" she later told Barry Mazor. As promised by Columbia, Smith was allowed to include two gospel selections per secular album, a theme that she would continue at the label. When choosing the two gospel songs for the collection, Smith said that she chose material that she "thought would fit the album more" and "would have a message".

== Release, chart performance and singles ==
A Lady Named Smith was released by Columbia Records in May 1973. It was Smith's first album with the label and the twenty second studio album released in her career. The label distributed it as a vinyl LP, with five songs on "side A" and six songs on "side B". Columbia also issued a cassette version that had an identical track listing. The album debuted on the American Billboard Top Country Albums chart on May 26, 1973. It spent five weeks on the chart and peaked at the number 31 position on June 16, 1973. It was Smith's third album to peak in the top 40. The album's only single was the track "You've Got Me (Right Where You Want Me)". Columbia released the single in March 1973. The single peaked at number 21 on the Billboard Hot Country Songs chart in May 1973. It was her first career solo single to miss the Billboard top 20.

== Track listing ==
Side one
No.	Title	Writer(s)	Length
1.	"You've Got Me (Right Where You Want Me)"	George Richey; Connie Smith	2:23
2.	"Soul Song"	Richey; Billy Sherrill; Norro Wilson	2:20
3.	"Jesus"	Bill Gaither	3:21
4.	"When You Hurt Me More Than I Love You"	Jerry Foster; Bill Rice	2:24
5.	"Never Love Again"	Bill Deaton; Doug Kershaw; Rusty Kershaw	2:48

Side two
No.	Title	Writer(s)	Length
1.	"The House Where Love Shines"	Dallas Frazier	2:33
2.	"Love Held on To Me"	Helen Cornelius	2:35
3.	"Pass Me By (If You're Only Passing Through)"	Hillman Hall	2:50
4.	"Too Soon to Know"	Don Gibson	3:10
5.	"Let's All Go Down to the River"	Earl Montgomery; Sue Richards	2:09
6.	"A Picture of Me (Without You)"	Richey; Wilson	2:39

== Personnel ==
All credits are adapted from the liner notes of A Lady Named Smith and the biography booklet by Barry Mazor titled The Latest Shade of Blue.

Musical personnel

- Byron Bach – Cello
- Brenton Banks – Strings
- Harold Bradley – Guitar
- Jimmy Capps – Guitar
- Jerry Carrigan – Drums
- Marvin Chantry – Strings
- Ray Edenton – Rhythm guitar
- Carol Gorodetzky – Strings
- Lennie Haight – Strings
- John Hughey – Steel guitar
- The Jordanaires – Background vocals
- Charlie McCoy – Harmonica
- Bill McElhiney – Trumpet
- Bob Moore – Electric bass
- Weldon Myrick – Steel guitar
- The Nashville Edition – Background vocals
- Jo Parker – Strings
- Leon Rhodes – Electric guitar
- George Richey – Housepiano, piano
- Hargus "Pig" Robbins – Piano
- Billy Sanford – Electric guitar, leader
- Zina Schiff – Strings
- Connie Smith – Lead vocals
- Henry Strzelecki – Electric bass
- Donald Teal – Strings
- David Vanderkooi – Cello
- Gary Van Osdale – Strings
- Pete Wade – Guitar
- Chip Young – Guitar

Technical personnel

- Bill Barnes – Design
- Lou Bradley – Engineer
- Shelly Kurland – String leader
- Slick Lawson – Photography
- Bill McElhiney – Arranger
- Peggy Owens – Design
- George Richey – Producer

== Chart performance ==
Chart (1973)	Peak position
US Top Country Albums (Billboard)	31

== Release history ==
Region	Date	Format	Label	Ref.
North America	May 1973	Vinyl	Columbia Records	
North America	May 1973	Cassette	Columbia Records	
Japan	May 1973	Vinyl	CBS Records/Sony Music	
