= My Little Cousin =

Single by Benny Goodman and his orchestra
- A-side: "A Zoot Suit (for My Sunday Gal)" "My Little Cousin"
- Released: 1942
- Genre: Jazz
- Label: Okeh
- Songwriters: H. Lewis; Braverman; Coben

Audio
- "My Little Cousin" on YouTube

"My Little Cousin" is a song written by Happy Lewis, Sam Braverman, and Cy Coben that was a hit for Benny Goodman and his orchestra, with a vocal chorus by Peggy Lee, in 1942.

== Critical reception ==
Benny Goodman and his orchestra version
Review scores
Source	Rating
Billboard	favorable
Billboard	favorable

Billboard favorably reviewed Benny Goodman's recording (Okeh 6606, coupled with "A Zoot Suit (for My Sunday Gal)") in its issue from March 21, 1942.

== Track listing ==
78 rpm (Okeh 6606)

32318
No.	Title	Writer(s)	Note(s)	Length
1.	"A Zoot Suit (for My Sunday Gal)"	Gilbert; O'Brien	Fox trot Vocal chorus by Art London

32384
No.	Title	Writer(s)	Note(s)	Length
1.	"My Little Cousin"	H. Lewis; Braverman; Coben	Fox trot Vocal chorus by Peggy Lee
