= Jim Harrison (American football) =

American football player (born 1948)

No. 35
- Position: Running back

Personal information
- Born: September 10, 1948 (age 78); San Antonio, Texas, U.S.
- Listed height: 6 ft 4 in (1.93 m)
- Listed weight: 235 lb (107 kg)

Career information
- High school: Brackenridge (San Antonio)
- College: Missouri
- NFL draft: 1971: 2nd round, 28th overall pick

Career history
- Chicago Bears (1971–1974); BC Lions (1977)

Career NFL statistics
- Rushing attempts: 308
- Rushing yards: 1,099
- Total TDs: 7
- Stats at Pro Football Reference

Hulet James Harrison Jr. (born September 10, 1948) is an American former professional football player who was a running back in the National Football League (NFL). He played college football for the Missouri Tigers and was selected by the Chicago Bears in the second round of the 1971 NFL draft.
