= Run Away Little Tears =

Single by Connie Smith

from the album I Love Charley Brown
- B-side: "Let Me Help You Work It Out"
- Released: April 1968
- Genre: Country
- Label: RCA Victor
- Songwriter(s): Dallas Frazier
- Producer(s): Bob Ferguson

Connie Smith singles chronology
"Baby's Back Again" (1967)	"Run Away Little Tears" (1968)	"Cry, Cry, Cry" (1968)

"Run Away Little Tears" is a single by American country music artist Connie Smith. Released in April 1968, the song reached #10 on the Billboard Hot Country Singles chart. The single was later released on Smith's 1968 album entitled I Love Charley Brown. The single also reached #18 on the Canadian RPM Country Tracks chart in 1968, becoming her second single to chart in Canada.

== Chart performance ==
Chart (1968)	Peak position
U.S. Billboard Hot Country Singles	10
CAN RPM Country Tracks	18
