= Baby's Back Again =

1967 single by Connie Smith

Single by Connie Smith

from the album I Love Charley Brown
- B-side: "It Only Hurts for a Little While"
- Released: December 1967
- Genre: Country
- Label: RCA Victor
- Songwriter: Betty Jean Robinson
- Producer: Bob Ferguson

Connie Smith singles chronology
"Burning a Hole in My Mind" (1967)	"Baby's Back Again" (1967)	"Run Away Little Tears" (1968)

"Baby's Back Again" is a single by American country music artist Connie Smith. Released in December 1967, the song reached #7 on the Billboard Hot Country Singles chart. The single was later released on Smith's 1968 album entitled I Love Charley Brown. The song became Smith's first single to chart on the Canadian RPM Country Tracks chart, reaching #7 as well.

== Chart performance ==
Chart (1967–1968)	Peak position
U.S. Billboard Hot Country Singles	7
CAN RPM Country Tracks	7
