= Dream Painter (song) =

Single by Connie Smith

from the album Dream Painter
- B-side: "Once a Day"
- Released: June 1973
- Recorded: April 1972
- Studio: RCA Studio B
- Genre: Country
- Length: 2:45
- Label: RCA Victor
- Songwriter(s): Dallas Frazier; Sanger D. Shafer
- Producer(s): Bob Ferguson

Connie Smith singles chronology
"You've Got Me (Right Where You Want Me)" (1973)	"Dream Painter" (1973)	"Ain't Love a Good Thing" (1973)

"Dream Painter" is a song composed by Dallas Frazier and Sanger D. Shafer. It was originally recorded by American country music singer Connie Smith. The song was Smith's final single for RCA Victor Records, upon its release in 1973. The same year it was issued on among her final album releases for RCA.

== Background, release and chart performance ==
By 1973, Connie Smith had nearly a decade of success on RCA Victor Records, with hit country songs like "Once a Day" (1964), "I Never Once Stopped Loving You" and "If It Ain't Love (Let's Leave It Alone)" (1972). In 1973, Smith made the decision to leave her recording contract and sign with Columbia Records. Smith actually recorded "Dream Painter" a year prior to her RCA departure, specifically in April 1972 at RCA Studio B. The session was produced by Bob Ferguson. She also cut two additional sides during the same recording session.

"Dream Painter" was Smith's final single issued with RCA Victor Records. The single was released in June 1973, backed by a re-recorded version of Smith's 1964 original hit, "Once a Day". The song spent ten weeks on the Billboard Hot Country Songs chart and peaked at number 23 in August 1973. It was Smith's final single release with RCA and second solo single to peak outside the top 20 of the Billboard country chart. It also peaked at number 39 on the RPM Country Singles chart in Canada. It was later issued on Smith's RCA compilation, also titled Dream Painter.

== Track listing ==
7" vinyl single

- "Dream Painter" – 2:45
- "Once a Day" – 2:47

== Charts ==
Chart (1973)	Peak position
Canada Country Songs (RPM)	39
US Hot Country Songs (Billboard)	23
