= Subverted rhyme =

Type of wordplay

A subverted rhyme, teasing rhyme or mind rhyme is the suggestion of a rhyme which is left unsaid and must be inferred by the listener. A rhyme may be subverted either by stopping short, or by replacing the expected word with another (which may have the same rhyme or not). Teasing rhyme is a form of innuendo, where the unsaid word is taboo or completes a sentence indelicately.

An example, in the context of cheerleading:

Raa Raa REE!
Kick 'em in the knee!
Raa Raa RASS!
Kick 'em in the other knee!

where the presumption is that the listener anticipates the chant ending with "ass" rather than "other knee".

Subverted rhyme is often a form of wordplay. The implied rhyme is inferable only from the context. This contrasts with rhyming slang from which the rhyming portion has been clipped, which is part of the lexicon. (An example is dogs, meaning "feet", a clipping of rhyming dog's meat.)

== Examples ==
A traditional example is the song "Sweet Violets", which begins:

There once was a farmer who took a young miss
In back of the barn where he gave her a...
Lecture on horses and chickens and eggs
And told her that she had such beautiful...
Manners that suited a girl [etc.]

Alan Bold described the 20th century anonymous bawdy poem about the "young man of Brighton Pier" as "perhaps the finest of the teasing-rhyme variety of bawdy poem". An extract will illustrate the technique:

One very hot day in the summer last year
A young man was seen swimming round Brighton Pier;
He dived underneath it and swam to a rock
And amused all the ladies by shaking his
Fist at a copper who stood on the shore,
The very same copper who copped him before.
For the policeman to order him out was a farce,
For the cheeky young man simply showed him his
Graceful manoeuvres and wonderful pace...

"Something You Can Do with Your Finger" from South Park uses enjambment to replace taboo words with non-taboo phrases with the same initial syllable. For example shit>shih-tzu and meat>meeting, in the following fragment, each start a new sentence instead of finishing the old one:

I don't want my breakfast, because it tastes like—
Shih Tzus make good housepets, they're cuddly and sweet,
Monkeys aren't good to have, because they like to beat their—
Meeting in the office, [...]

Similarly, the childhood rhyme "Miss Suzie" ends each section with what sounds like a taboo word, only to continue with a more innocent word.

Miss Suzie had a steamboat,
the steamboat had a bell,
Miss Suzie went to heaven,
the steamboat went to
Hello operator
please give me number nine [...]

Another example is the 1985 Bowser and Blue song "Polka-Dot Undies", which begins:

I went for a ride in my pickup truck
I picked up my girl, 'cuz I wanted to
Show her my gloves, 'cuz she had on her mitts
And I blushed brightly when she showed me her
Perfume that she buys whenever Avon calls,
So I took off my pants, and I showed her my
Polka-dot undies!
My polka-dot undies!

The 2003 song "Mr. Brightside" by The Killers transitions from the verses to the chorus with a mind rhyme of dick:

Now they're going to bed
And my stomach is sick
And it's all in my head
But she's touching his chest now

In the 2001 movie Shrek, the song Welcome to Duloc sang by the Duloc dolls greeting Shrek uses a subverted rhyme with a mind rhyme of ass

Please keep off of the grass
Shine your shoes, wipe your (puppet pauses)...face

The novelty song "Shaving Cream" by Benny Bell uses a mind rhyme in each verse, for example:

I have a sad story to tell you.
It may hurt your feelings a bit.
Last night, when I walked in my bathroom,
I stepped in a big pile of shaving cream,
be nice and clean,
shave everyday and you'll always look keen.

A more wholesome example of a subverted rhyme can be found in the lyrics of "In Summer" from Disney's 2013 film Frozen. In the song, Olaf, an anthropomorphic snowman, optimistically fantasizes about warm summer weather. Children can infer that the last line should end with puddle, as it completes the rhyme with cuddle (and is what a snowman actually becomes in summer). In the film, this lyric is accompanied by a visual cue of Olaf pausing, then jumping over a puddle.

Winter's a good time to stay in and cuddle,
but put me in summer and I'll be a ...happy snowman!

Occasionally, the presence (or absence) of a subverted rhyme can be cause for discussion or debate as to the "true" meaning of a song. For example, in Taylor Swift's track "The Very First Night", the lyrics

Didn't read the note on the Polaroid picture
They don't know how much I miss you!

and

No one knows about the words that we whispered
No one knows how much I miss you

have led some to theorise that the clearly-enunciated pronunciation of 'you', which subverts the expected rhyme of an unstressed 'ya', is intentional hint towards an alternative subverted rhyme with the pronoun 'her'. This would change the assumed gender of the song's romantic love interest, making it a controversial subject.

== History ==
Teasing rhymes have been popular since the 17th century. Though fairly rare in canonical literature, examples of mind rhyme can be found in the work of William Shakespeare, Emily Dickinson, Marianne Moore and others. In Lewis Carroll's "'Tis the Voice of the Lobster" it is generally assumed that the last words of the interrupted poem could be supplied by the reader as "— eating the Owl".

== See also ==
- Crambo
- Mondegreen
- Rhyming slang
- Roses Are Red
