= Love Is the Look You're Looking For (song) =

Single by Connie Smith

from the album Love Is the Look You're Looking For
- B-side: "My Ecstasy"
- Released: December 1972
- Genre: Country
- Label: RCA Records
- Songwriter(s): Rose Lee Maphis
- Producer(s): Bob Ferguson

Connie Smith singles chronology
"If It Ain't Love (Let's Leave It Alone)" (1972)	"Love Is the Look You're Looking For" (1972)	"You've Got Me (Right Where You Want Me)" (1973)

"Love Is the Look You're Looking For" is a single written by American country music artist Rose Lee Maphis for American country music artist Connie Smith. Released in December 1972, the song reached #8 on the Billboard Hot Country Singles chart. The song was issued onto Smith's 1973 compilation of the same name. It became Smith's last top ten single on RCA Records. In addition, "Love Is the Look You're Looking For" peaked at #6 on the Canadian RPM Country Tracks chart around the same time.

== Chart performance ==
Chart (1972–73)	Peak position
U.S. Billboard Hot Country Singles	8
CAN RPM Country Tracks	6
