= Dream Painter =

Compilation album by Connie Smith
- Released: July 1973
- Recorded: 1964 – 1972
- Studio: RCA Victor Studios
- Genre: Country
- Label: RCA Victor
- Producer: Bob Ferguson

Connie Smith chronology
A Lady Named Smith (1973)	Dream Painter (1973)	Connie Smith's Greatest Hits, Vol. I (1973)

Singles from Dream Painter
- 1. "Dream Painter" Released: June 1973

Dream Painter is a compilation album by American country singer Connie Smith, issued in July 1973 by RCA Victor. The album was released following Smith's departure from RCA Victor and contained previously released material. Two new recordings were also featured, including the title track. Released as a single, the title track would reach the top 30 of American country songs chart. The album itself would chart the American country LP's chart in 1973.

== Background, recording and content ==
Connie Smith reached the peak of her commercial career while recording for RCA Victor. Between 1964 and 1973, she would have 18 top ten country singles and release a series of popular albums. In 1973, Smith left RCA Victor and was signed by Columbia Records. After Smith transitioned to Columbia, RCA Victor released several LP's that compiled some of Smith's most popular recordings, singles and album cuts. Among the RCA compilations released during this period was Dream Painter in 1973. The album contained ten tracks in total, eight of which were previously released. Among these previously released songs was the track "Tiny Blue Transistor Radio", which originally appeared as B-side to Smith's 1965 single "Then and Only Then".

Two new recordings were also part of the Dream Painter track listing. The title track was one new recording, penned by Dallas Frazier and Sanger D. Shafer. Frazier had been a close friend of Smith's and she had previously cut a series of songs penned by him. A second new recording was the gospel track, "All the Praises". In 1974, the song was nominated by the Grammy Awards for Best Inspirational Performance. The album's two new recordings were cut in sessions held in 1972. The eight previously released tracks were recorded between 1964 and 1972 at RCA Victor Studios in Nashville, Tennessee. All sessions were produced by Bob Ferguson.

== Release and reception ==
Dream Painter was released by the RCA Victor label in July 1973. It was distributed as a vinyl LP, containing five songs on either side of the record. The album debuted on the American Billboard Country LP's chart on August 11, 1973. It spent seven weeks on the chart before peaking at the number 39 position on September 15, 1973. Following its release, Billboard magazine gave the disc a positive response when reviewing the album: "RCA has reached again into its files to get fine cuts by its departed (to Columbia) Connie Smith, and comes up with enough to make it a fine album." The title track was released as a single prior in June 1973. Later that year, the single reached number 23 on the Billboard Hot Country Songs chart and number 39 on Canada's RPM Country chart.

== Track listing ==
Side one
No.	Title	Writer(s)	Length
1.	"Dream Painter"	Dallas Frazier; Sanger D. Shafer	2:44
2.	"Born a Woman"	Martha Sharp	2:27
3.	"I Can Turn Your World Around"	Harry Ebner; Jack Rhodes; Billie Jo Spears	2:22
4.	"Don't Keep Me Lonely Too Long"	Melba Montgomery	2:25
5.	"Sunshine of My World"	Frazier	2:09

Side two
No.	Title	Writer(s)	Length
1.	"Tiny Blue Transistor Radio"	Bill Anderson	2:30
2.	"Everybody Loves Somebody"	Ken Lane; Irving Taylor	2:55
3.	"All the Praises"	Jerry Strickland; Carmol Taylor	2:24
4.	"I Love You Drops"	Bill Anderson	2:41
5.	"Love Is No Excuse"	Justin Tubb	2:55

== Chart performance ==
Chart (1973)	Peak position
US Top Country Albums (Billboard)	39

== Release history ==
Region	Date	Format	Label	Ref.
North America	July 1973	Vinyl	RCA Victor Records	
