= George Cheroke =

American football player (1921–1986)

- Cheroke in 1946

No. 34
- Position: Guard

Personal information
- Born: January 2, 1921; Jenners, Pennsylvania, U.S.
- Died: October 19, 1986 (aged 65); Pico Rivera, California, U.S.
- Listed height: 5 ft 9 in (1.75 m)
- Listed weight: 195 lb (88 kg)

Career information
- High school: Shadyside (Shadyside, Ohio)
- College: Ohio State

Career history
- Cleveland Browns (1946)

Awards and highlights
- AAFC champion (1946)

Career statistics
- Games: 12
- Stats at Pro Football Reference

George "Chief" Cheroke (January 2, 1921 – October 19, 1986) was an American professional football player who was a guard for one season with the Cleveland Browns of the All-America Football Conference (AAFC). Cheroke grew up in Ohio and played college football for the Ohio State Buckeyes, where he was a standout player as a sophomore in 1941 under head coach Paul Brown. He left Ohio State after the season to join the military during World War II. When he was discharged in 1946, he joined the Browns, a new team in the AAFC coached by Brown. The Browns won the 1946 AAFC championship, but Cheroke was traded away at the end of the season. He cut his football career short to re-enlist in the Army, where he stayed for 20 years. He retired in 1965 and settled in California, working for Beckman Instrument Company in Los Angeles. Nephew George Cheroke born 8/25/43(named after uncle George) is a life long Cleveland Browns fan living in Post Falls, ID. with wife Kay.

== College and professional career ==
Cheroke grew up in Shadyside, Ohio, and attended Ohio State University, where he played guard on the school's football team starting as a sophomore in 1941. Cheroke saw his first action on the varsity team after Lin Houston, the regular starter at right guard, suffered an injury. In his first game, against Pitt, Cheroke blocked a punt that led to a safety. The Ohio State Buckeyes posted a 6–1–1 record in 1941 under head coach Paul Brown and were ranked 13th in the nation by the Associated Press. He was given a trophy by the Ohio State Journal Downtown Quarterback Club as the sophomore who improved the most during the season. Cheroke left Ohio State before the 1942 season to serve in the Army Air Force during World War II. He spent over four years in the service and was deployed in the European Theatre of World War II for 18 months, rising to the rank of captain.

After his discharge in 1946, Cheroke joined the Cleveland Browns, a team under formation in the All-America Football Conference and coached by Paul Brown. Cheroke was one of five Ohio State players who signed with the Browns despite having remaining college eligibility, which caused a controversy because some Ohio State alumni and administrators wanted them to come back and play at the collegiate level. Cheroke played in all of the Browns' games in 1946 as the team finished the regular season with a 12–2 record and won the AAFC championship game.

Brown traded Cheroke and four other players to the Baltimore Colts for guard Weldon Humble before the start of the 1947 season. Cheroke, however, did not play in any games for the Colts, opting instead to re-enlist in the Army.

== Later life and death ==
Cheroke spent 20 years in the Army, retiring at the end of 1965. He settled in Whittier, California and worked for Beckman Instrument Company in Los Angeles. He died in 1986.
