= Suzanne Muldowney =

American performance artist

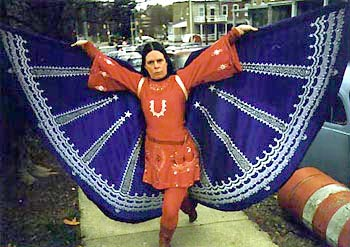
- Muldowney in her handmade Underdog costume
- Born: August 13, 1952 (age 74); Camden, New Jersey, U.S.
- Other names: Underdog, Underdog Lady
- Occupation: Performance artist
- Years active: 1976–present
- Known for: Being a member of the Wack Pack on The Howard Stern Show

Suzanne Muldowney (born August 13, 1952), nicknamed Underdog Lady or simply Underdog, is a performance artist known for her appearances in parades in various cities throughout the years in her elaborate homemade costumes. She often dresses as the cartoon character Underdog. She came to national attention through her appearances on and calls to The Howard Stern Show to discuss and perform her dance interpretation of Underdog. There she was given the nickname "Underdog Lady", though she personally rejects this name and prefers to be referred to as simply "Underdog" when wearing the costume.

== History ==
A longtime resident of Delran Township, New Jersey, Muldowney studied ballet as a child, and began performing interpretive dances of fictional characters in 1976. By 1980, she was appearing at costume contests at science fiction conventions. It was during this time that Muldowney started performing as the cartoon superhero Underdog. She has explained in an interview, "I try to do certain movements that simulate flight and heroism. I'll make like I'm flying by doing leaps and other things. I also will do some camel spins. Basically I do movements that best portray Underdog. I try to do him more refined and sophisticated than the original character was."

In 1987, Muldowney began appearing in seasonal parades up and down the East Coast. Though her most famous dance interpretation is of Underdog, she has also portrayed Dracula, Catwoman, and Supergirl, along with self-created characters such as Shelley the South Jersey Shore Mermaid, Irish Cinderella, and Spectrum the Ghost King. She sews all her own costumes, which are known for their exacting detail and elaborate ornamentation. For example, the interior of her Underdog cape is lined with streaks of silver, representing the streaks of light trailing behind the animated Underdog.

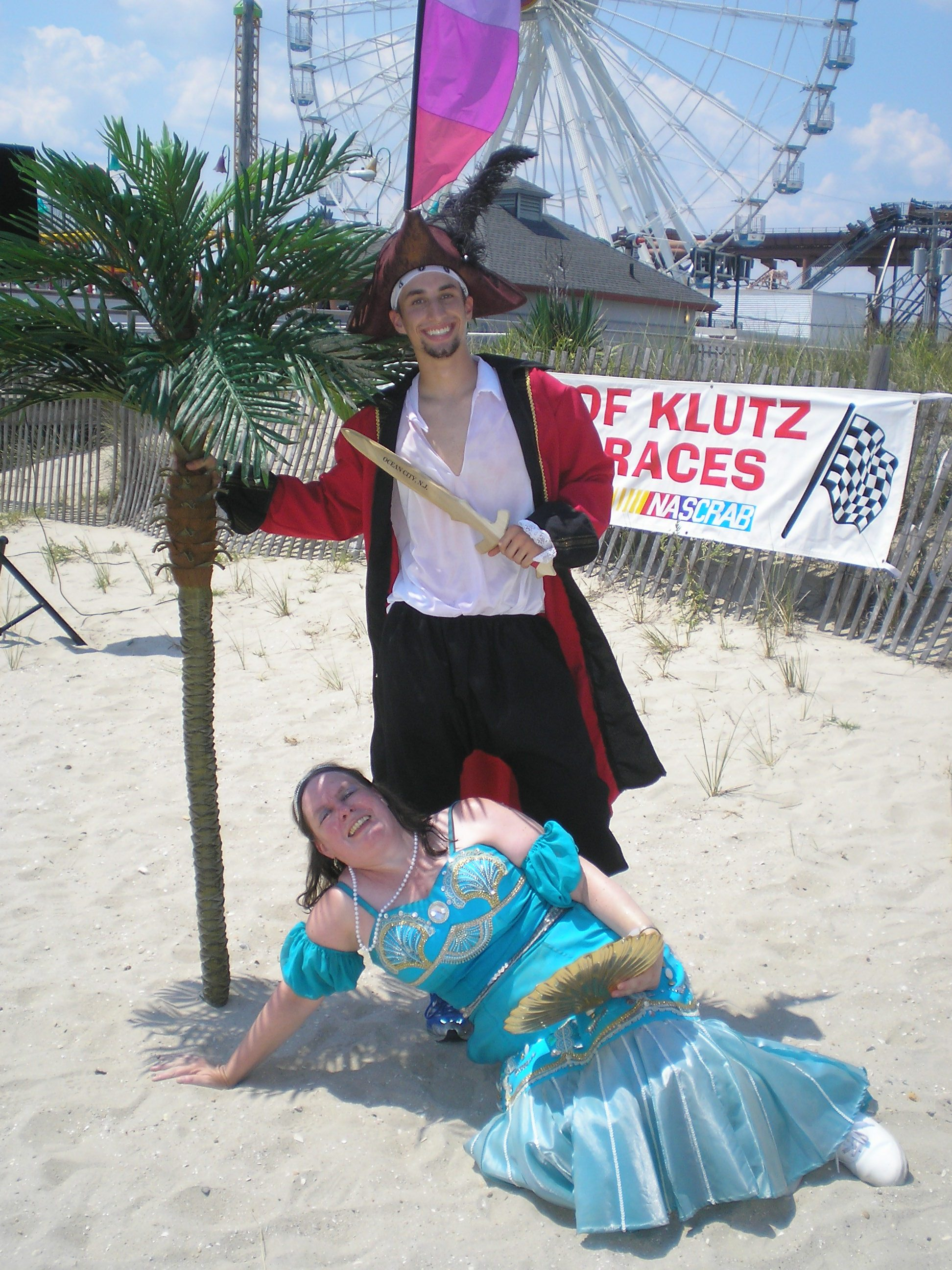
Muldowney dressed as Shelly the Mermaid at the Annual Hermit Crab Races in Ocean City, New Jersey. Muldowney is accompanied by Dan Gaspar, an employee of a local business, Air Circus Kite Shop.

Muldowney's earliest television appearances were on the public-access program Beyond Vaudeville. Her first appearance was in 1986 and she continued to appear on the show through 1996. She also appeared in live stage versions of the show at New York University (1986-1990), Stand Up New York (1991), and Caroline's Comedy Club (1992-1994). She also appeared on Oddville, MTV.

Muldowney made several appearances on Howard Stern's radio and television shows throughout the 1990s. A serious performer, she regrets her association with the program because of Stern's lewd jokes, and has called him her "nemesis". In 2006, she appeared as a guest on Jimmy Kimmel Live! to demonstrate a new form of dancing she called "figure jogging".

In 2006, the documentary My Life as an Underdog was released by director Boris Gavrilovic.

Muldowney has been diagnosed with Asperger syndrome.
