= You've Got Me (Right Where You Want Me) =

- Side A of the US single

Single by Connie Smith

from the album A Lady Named Smith
- B-side: "A Picture of Me (Without You)"
- Released: March 1973
- Recorded: January 1973
- Studio: Columbia Recording Studio
- Genre: Country; Countrypolitan
- Length: 2:20
- Label: Columbia
- Songwriters: George Richey; Connie Smith
- Producer: George Richey

Connie Smith singles chronology
"Love Is the Look You're Looking for" (1972)	"You've Got Me (Right Where You Want Me)" (1973)	"Dream Painter" (1973)

"You've Got Me (Right Where You Want Me)" is a song originally recorded by American country music singer Connie Smith. It was composed by Smith herself, along with George Richey. The song was Smith's debut single for Columbia Records, upon its release in 1973. The same year it was issued on her first album with Columbia titled A Lady Named Smith.

== Background, release and chart performance ==
By 1973, Connie Smith had nearly a decade of success on RCA Victor Records, with hit country songs like "Once a Day" (1964), "I Never Once Stopped Loving You" and "If It Ain't Love (Let's Leave It Alone)" (1972). In 1973, Smith made the decision to leave her recording contract and sign with Columbia Records. She began recording alongside producer George Richey, who helped compose the song "You've Got Me (Right Where You Want Me)". Smith also contributed to the song's composition. The track was recorded in her first session in Columbia, which occurred in January 1973. Produced by George Richey, the session took place at the Columbia Recording Studio in Nashville, Tennessee.

"You've Got Me (Right Where You Want Me)" was released as Smith's first single for Columbia Records in March 1973. It was backed on the flip side by Smith's cover of George Jones's "A Picture of Me (Without You)". The song spent 12 weeks on the Billboard Hot Country Songs chart and peaked at number 21 in May 1973. It was Smith's first solo single to peak outside the top 20 of the Billboard country chart. It was later issued on her debut studio LP with Columbia Records titled A Lady Named Smith. The disc was also released in 1973.

In 1984, Reba McEntire recorded a cover of "You've Got Me (Right Where You Want Me)" for her album titled My Kind of Country. McEntire chose the song to record after re-discovering a series of old tapes and LP's in her music collection.

== Track listing ==
7" vinyl single

- "You've Got Me (Right Where You Want Me)" – 2:20
- "A Picture of Me (Without You)" – 2:38

== Charts ==
Chart (1973)	Peak position
US Hot Country Songs (Billboard)	21
