= Sweet Violets =

Song

"Sweet Violets" is an American song (Roud 10232) that contains classic example of a "censored rhyme", where the expected rhyme of each couplet or verse is replaced with a surprising word which segues into the next couplet or chorus. For example, the first couplets of the version recorded by Dinah Shore are:

There once was a farmer who took a young miss
In back of the barn where he gave her a...
Lecture on horses and chickens and eggs
And told her that she had such beautiful...
Manners that suited a girl [etc.]

Although many versions use the melody from "My Bonnie Lies Over the Ocean", the chorus is taken from the song "Sweet Violets" by Joseph Emmet, from his 1882 play Fritz Among the Gypsies. Only the melody and the phrase "Sweet violets, sweeter than all the roses" are retained from Emmet's original version; the chorus is usually sung one of two ways:

Sweet violets, sweeter than the roses
Covered all over from head to toe
Covered all over with sweet violets

Or:

Sweet violets, sweeter than all the roses
Covered all over from head to foot
Covered all over with snow

One of the earliest recordings of the subverted rhyme versions of the song is a hot jazz arrangement released by Benny Bell in 1932, with a verse form similar to his song "Shaving Cream" and featuring bawdy lyrics and the "covered all over with snow" chorus.

When I was a handsome young fellow
I sure had the time of my life
But one day a man broke my backbone
When I ran away with his...
Sweet violets, sweeter than all the roses...

A recording of a country waltz version by The Sons of the Pioneers was released in 1936 with different lyrics from Bell's recording, including a bawdier version of the barber verse which in Bell's version relies on a rhyme with "nose."

I went for a shave and a haircut
The barber showed me a trick
He took out a big brand new razor,
and cut off the end of my...
Sweet violets, sweeter than all the roses...

In 1950, a field recording of legendary folk musician Harry McClintock was released by Folkways Records, featuring the singer late in his life performing a version where each verse relies on rhyming with the word "shit."

My father works down in the sewer
And he carries a lamp to be lit
And he wishes the sewer were purer
For he don't like the smell of the...
Sweet violets, sweeter than all the roses...

== Dinah Shore version ==
A popular version was recorded by Dinah Shore with Henri René's Orchestra & Chorus in Hollywood on May 20, 1951. The song was released by RCA Victor Records as catalog number 20-4174A (78 rpm record), 47-4174A (single) (in USA), by EMI on the His Master's Voice label as catalog number B 10115 in the UK, and EA 3997 in Australia, also on the His Master's Voice label. The Dinah Shore version was arranged by Cy Coben and Charles Grean. It reached number 3 on the Billboard chart.

This version has also been recorded by Mitch Miller and the Gang, Jane Turzy, and Judy Lynn.

The song (in all its versions, combined) reached number one on the Cash Box best-seller chart.

A German cover version exists by Rudi Carell (Goethe war gut).
