= Benny Bell =

American singer-songwriter (1906–1999)

- Born: Benjamin Samberg; March 21, 1906; New York City, U.S.
- Died: July 6, 1999 (aged 93) New York City, U.S.
- Genres: Comedy; novelty
- Occupations: Singer; songwriter
- Years active: 1929–1997

Benny Bell (born Benjamin Samberg; March 21, 1906 – July 6, 1999) was an American singer-songwriter who reached popularity in the 1940s, with a comeback in the 1970s. He is remembered for his risqué but cheerfully optimistic songs.

== Career ==
Benny Bell was born to an immigrant Jewish family in New York City. His father wanted him to be a rabbi, but after trying various odd jobs including self-employed street peddler, he decided to pursue a career in vaudeville and music, sometimes under the names Benny Bimbo and Paul Wynn. His first record, "The Alimony Blues" (backed with "Fast Asleep on a Mountain"), for Plaza Records on December 16, 1929 was a comical song about preferring to spend time in jail rather than pay alimony. He went on to write approximately 600 songs, most of which are documented in his many notebooks, ledgers and copyright papers.

In addition to songs with English lyrics, he wrote and recorded in Yiddish and Hebrew, sometimes mixing two or three languages in one song (e.g. "Bar Mitzvah Boy" which uses three). According to liner notes on his albums, these songs should be understood by listeners who speak any of the languages.

Bell founded his own record company under a variety of names: Bell Enterprises, Madison Records, Zion Records, and Kosher Comedy Records. He also wrote and recorded commercial jingles for radio. His jingle for Lemke's cockroach powder, sung in a mixture of Yiddish and English, has been released on record.

Bell enjoyed writing risqué lyrics, and in 1939 he was advised that he could make so-called party records with "blue" lyrics, primarily for use in jukeboxes in cocktail bars. He entered into this endeavour using his self-established record company, while continuing to make ethnic and mainstream comedy records. In an interview on the Dr. Demento radio program, Bell stated that he kept his straight and blue careers separate for many years, the latter being a secret. His eventual fame would come from his risqué material. His first jukebox release was a hot jazz arrangement of a traditional risqué drinking song, "Sweet Violets", but his first big success in this field was an original song, "Take a Ship for Yourself".

In 1946, he released his three highest-selling songs: "Take a Ship for Yourself," "Pincus the Peddler" which drew from his personal experience in the trade, and the notorious "Shaving Cream". "Pincus the Peddler" became Bell's signature tune, despite the title character's disreputable violent tendencies, and it concludes with his deportation to Petrograd (now Saint Petersburg, Russia). Each verse in "Shaving Cream" ends with a mind rhyme of shit, the initial sh- transitioning into the refrain, "Shaving cream, be nice and clean..." The same technique was used in "Sweet Violets" and many other songs — it is known among folklorists as "teasing songs".

He continued recording and releasing records into the 1980s, but he remained little-known beyond New York City until the 1970s when "Shaving Cream" was played regularly on the Dr. Demento radio program, leading to its re-issue as a single in 1975 on the Vanguard Records label, along with a similarly titled album. The single reached No. 30 in the US and No. 57 in Australia. Around this time, Bell was writing songs about topics such as disco and the Watergate scandal.

Bell continued self-releasing vinyl albums into the 1980s, and they often resemble 1950s releases, featuring somewhat plain covers with the same graphics (an array of laughing heads) re-used for decades, or with no art except a plain cover with hole to view the label. He continued to issue LP albums long after that format was considered obsolete. Some albums have new spoken jokes edited into breaks in older songs as "asides", a technique Bell had been using since the 1950s, and some songs contain comic interruptions made over several decades.

In the early 1990s Bell appeared at the Bottom Line with Doctor Demento and "Weird Al" Yankovic.

A book called Grandpa Had a Long One: Personal Notes on the Life, Career and Legacy of Benny Bell, which is a combination biography and memoir written by his grandson, Joel Samberg, was published by BearManor Media and released in 2009. Joel Samberg, who collaborated with his grandfather on a few recordings and videos in the 1970s and 1980s, also recorded several new versions of "Shaving Cream" after Benny Bell's death, using his grandfather's music with updated lyrics. These include "Presidential Shaving Cream," which skewered the presidential and vice presidential candidates in 2008, and "Holiday Shaving Cream," which paints potent pictures of Christmas and Chanukkah traditions.

In 1997, Bell made his last TV appearance on Oddville, MTV at age 91. It was one of two appearances he made on the show. He also made a TV appearance on Beyond Vaudeville in 1991 and appeared twice at Beyond Vaudeville live shows at Caroline's Comedy Club in New York in 1993.

In 1995, Bell suffered a fall and was admitted to Good Samaritan Hospital in Suffern, New York.

Bell died in New York on July 6, 1999, at the age of 93. His son, Charles Samberg, donated the vast majority of Bell's works to Florida Atlantic University in Boca Raton, Florida.

== Albums discography ==
- Kosher Comedy (Kosher Comedy Records, 1956)
- Kosher Comedy (Zion Records 126, 1956, not the same album as above)
- Kosher Comedy (Madison Records 120, 1960, not the same album as either of the above)
- Jewish Comedy (1st Issue) (Bell Enterprises, LP album)
- Jewish Comedy (2nd Issue) (Bell Enterprises, LP album, essentially a "volume 2")
- Jewish American Novelty Tunes (Bell Enterprises, 1958)
- Pincus the Peddler (Zion Records 234, 1959, re-issue of above, as Benny Bell and the Agony Trio)
- To the Bride: "G'zint mit Parnussa" (Zion Records 252, as Benny Bell and the Brownsville Klezmers)
- Laugh Along With Pincus (Madison Records 523, re-issued with different cover in 1972)
- The Opera Star (Comic Opera) (Bell Enterprises 900, LP album)
- Be a Comedian (1958, re-issued as Bell Enterprises BB-801, 1961, LP instructional album)
- Shaving Cream (Vanguard Records VSD-79357, 1975)
- Showtime (Bell Enterprises 303, 1977, jokes by Slim Jim and songs by Benny Bell)
- The Hilarious Musical Comedy of Benny Bell (volumes 1 to 8, Benny Bell Records, on CD)
- Benny Bell: Another Close Shave (Benny Bell, 2005)

== See also ==
- List of 1970s one-hit wonders in the United States
