= Cy Coben =

American songwriter (1919–2006)

- Born: Seymour Cohen; April 4, 1919; Jersey City, New Jersey, United States
- Died: May 26, 2006 (aged 87)
- Occupation: Songwriter

Seymour "Cy" Coben (4 April 1919 – 26 May 2006) was an American songwriter whose hits were recorded by bandleaders, country singers, and other artists such as The Beatles, Tommy Cooper and Leonard Nimoy.

== Biography ==
=== Early life ===
Coben was born in Jersey City, New Jersey, United States, the youngest son of Harris ("Harry") Cohen and Nettie Brandt Cohen, and was originally named Seymour. His father was a wholesale meat supplier in New York City. Coben learned to play the trumpet and studied at a local music academy. In 1942 he had his first charting song with "My Little Cousin", which Benny Goodman's orchestra and vocalist Peggy Lee took to No. 14. Coben spent the next several years in the Navy, serving in the South Pacific as a pharmacist's mate. On his return in 1946, he resumed his song writing career. He wrote "A Good Woman's Love" for his wife Shirley Nagel, whom he married in 1948.

=== Post-war career ===
In 1947, Coben wrote a novelty song called "(When You See) Those Flying Saucers" which was released as a single by the Buchanan Brothers; his co-author was Charles Randolph Grean, who was working for RCA/Victor. Grean was to become a long-time collaborator of Coben's. In 1949, Coben first visited Nashville and soon became a part of the music business there. In Nashville, Coben wrote for a variety of artists, but was especially associated with Eddy Arnold; he wrote "There's Been a Change in Me" and "I Wanna Play House With You," two No. 1 country hits for Arnold in 1951, and went on to write many other songs for him, often with Charles Grean, who was Arnold's manager - "Eddy's Song", a No. 1 country hit in 1953; "Free Home Demonstration" (No. 4 country) in 1954, and others. Coben and Grean also wrote songs for other artists, such as their version of "Sweet Violets", which charted for Dinah Shore and Jane Turzy in 1951.

Coben wrote "Nobody's Child" with Mel Foree; Hank Snow recorded it in 1949. Lonnie Donegan later brought it to the United Kingdom, and the Beatles recorded it with Tony Sheridan during their early days playing in Hamburg, Germany. With Oliver Wallace, Coben wrote "How D'Ye Do and Shake Hands" for the 1951 Disney film Alice in Wonderland, which had a cover version that same year by the ad hoc foursome of Danny Kaye, Jimmy Durante, Jane Wyman, and Groucho Marx.

Coben wrote many novelty songs; one of his biggest novelty hits was "The Old Piano Roll Blues" (1950). He also wrote for Homer and Jethro - "The Billboard Song" became a much-recorded favorite, and "Don't Jump Off the Roof, Dad" was later a hit for British comedian Tommy Cooper. Coben wrote "How to Catch a Man" for country comedian Minnie Pearl and it became one of her standards. In 1977 country-rock band The New Riders of the Purple Sage recorded Coben's "Red Hot Women and Ice Cold Beer," in which Coben drew on his World War II experience in the U.S. Navy to describe what sailors wanted. His old collaborator Charles Grean was Leonard Nimoy's record producer, and Coben wrote several songs for him, such as "Alien" and "The Difference Between Us".

=== Reception in Europe ===
Coben's humor and sentiment translated well to the European market. Bill Ramsey took Coben's "Souvenirs" to No. 1 in Germany in 1959, and Belgian star Will Tura recorded a number of Coben tunes ("Show Me the Man"/"Waar is de man"; "The Great El Tigre"/"El Bandido"). "Goethe War Gut" charted in Germany for Rudi Carrell in 1978.

=== Later career ===
Comedian Sheb Wooley's 1968 song "Country Music Hall of Fame" (as Hee Haw regular "Ben Colder") envisioned Coben as a Hall of Fame inductee. But Coben was never elected to the Country Music Hall of Fame or the Nashville Songwriters Hall of Fame, according to his friend "Cowboy" Jack Clement, because "the young folks just don't know about him."

Coben retired to Atherton, California. He died on May 26, 2006, aged 87.

== Charting hits ==
- "My Little Cousin" (Coben/Happy Lewis/Sam Braverman) - No. 14 hit for Benny Goodman/Peggy Lee in 1942
- "There's No Wings On My Angel" (Coben/Arnold/Doug Melsher) - No. 6 Country/Western hit for Eddy Arnold, 1949
- "I Love the Guy" (Coben) - No. 10 pop hit for Sarah Vaughan and No. 22 for Fran Warren in 1950
- "Old Piano Roll Blues" - in 1950, charted for Hoagy Carmichael and Cass Daley (No. 11); Lawrence Cook (No. 13); Cliff Steward and the San Francisco Boys (No. 18); Eddie Cantor, Lisa Kirk, and the Sammy Kaye Orchestra (No. 25); Jan Garber and His Orchestra (No. 30); and The Jubalaires (No. 25). It also appeared on the soundtrack of the 1951 movie Rich, Young and Pretty
- "There's Been a Change in Me" (Coben) - No. 1 Country/Western hit for Eddy Arnold, 1951
- "I Wanna Play House with You" (Coben) - No. 1 Country/Western hit for Eddy Arnold, 1951
- "Meanderin'" (Coben/George Botsford/Charles R. Grean) - No. 28 pop hit for Vaughn Monroe in 1951
- "Something Old, Something New" (Coben/Grean) - B side of "I Wanna Play House with You", reached No. 4 for Arnold
- "Sweet Violets" - arranged by Coben and Grean; No. 3 pop hit for Dinah Shore, 1951; another 1951 version by Jane Turzy reached No. 11 on the Billboard jukebox chart, and Doris Drew took it to No. 22
- "Lonely Little Robin" (Coben) - No. 14 jukebox hit for The Pinetoppers in 1951; also No. 25 radio hit for Mindy Carson
- "Never Been Kissed" (Coben/Grean) - No. 19 pop hit for Freddy Martin in 1951
- "Easy on the Eyes" (Coben/Arnold) - No. 1 Country/Western hit for Eddy Arnold, 1952
- "Lady's Man" (Cy Coben) - No. 2 Country/Western hit for Hank Snow in 1952
- "Older and Bolder" (Cy Coben) - No. 3 Country/Western hit for Eddy Arnold in 1952
- "Do I Like It" (Coben) - No. 6 C/W hit for Carl Smith in 1953
- "Eddy's Song" (Charlie Grean, Cy Coben) - No. 1 Country/Western hit for Eddy Arnold in 1953
- "Free Home Demonstration" (Grean, Coben) - No. 4 Country/Western hit for Eddy Arnold in 1953
- "Beware of 'It'" - No. 9 C/W hit for Johnnie & Jack in 1954
- "Hep Cat Baby" - No. 7 Country/Western hit for Eddy Arnold in 1954
- "That Crazy Mambo Thing" - No. 10 C/W hit for Hank Snow in 1954
- "Would You Mind" - No. 3 C/W hit for Hank Snow, 1955
- "I Saw Esau" - No. 51 pop hit for The Ames Brothers in 1956
- "My Treasure" (Coben/Bill Templeton) - No. 31 pop hit for The Hilltoppers in 1956
- "Souvenirs" (Coben) - No. 1 hit in Germany for Bill Ramsey in 1959
- "Souvenirs, Souvenirs" (Coben) The Johnny Hallyday version of Coben's "Souvenirs", as adapted in French by Fernand Bonifay, was Hallyday's very first smash hit in France (#13), issued on June 13, 1960.
- "Don't Jump Off the Roof, Dad" - charted in the UK for Tommy Cooper in 1961
- "That Greasy Kid Stuff" - reached No. 74 for Janie Grant in 1962
- "I'm a Walkin' Advertisement (For the Blues)" - No. 32 Country hit for Norma Jean in 1964
- "The Great El Tigre (The Tiger)" (Coben) - No. 32 Country hit for Stu Phillips in 1966
- "The Game of Triangles" (Coben) - No. 5 Country hit for Norma Jean, Liz Anderson, and Bobby Bare in 1966
- "Burning a Hole in My Mind" (Coben) - No. 5 C/W hit for Connie Smith, 1967
- "Chet's Tune" (Coben) - No. 38 country hit by "Some of Chet's Friends" (a tribute to Chet Atkins, who was a friend of Coben)
- "Nobody's Child" (Coben/Mel Foree)- charted for Hank Williams Jr. (No. 46 Country, 1967), Karen Young (UK No. 6, 1969)
- "The Name of the Game Was Love" (Coben) - No. 16 Country for Hank Snow in 1969
- "Johnny's Cash and Charley's Pride" (Coben) - No. 38 C/W for Mac Wiseman in 1969
- "A Good Woman's Love" (Coben) - charted for Jerry Reed (No. 12 Country, 1974)
- "Goethe War Gut" (Cy Coben, Charles Grean, Thomas Woitkewitsch) - charted in Germany for Rudi Carrell in 1978
