= Jane Turzy =

American singer

Jane Turzy Trio in the early 1950s

Jane Turzy (1919 – November 20, 2001) was a Chicago, Illinois-born singer of traditional pop music.

She succeeded in reaching the popularity charts only in 1951 with three recordings she made for Decca Records. Her biggest hit, "Good Morning, Mister Echo", was credited to The Jane Turzy Trio because she overdubbed her voice twice to mimic the sound of a vocal trio, similar to the multitrack vocal effects heard earlier on ground-breaking hits by Patti Page and Mary Ford. Georgia Gibbs and Margaret Whiting issued competing versions, but Turzy's rendition charted the highest.

She also had a version of Sweet Violets (which competed with a version by Dinah Shore) and a song named I Like It. Turzy continued to release a dozen more singles for Decca through 1954 and then returned to their subsidiary label Coral Records for another single in 1958, Lonely Me and Honey Bee. Her last known release was for the B & F label in 1959, Who Baby Who and Looky Look.

== Good Morning Mister Echo ==
"Good Morning, Mister Echo" written by Bill and Belinda Putman was a popular song that was published in 1951.

Jane Turzy (overdubbing herself, billed as the Jane Turzy Trio) recorded the song for a hit. The recording was released by Decca Records as catalog number 27622. It first reached the Billboard magazine charts on June 29, 1951, and lasted 5 weeks on the chart, peaking at #12. Other hit versions were by Margaret Whiting (#14) and Georgia Gibbs (#21).

The pseudonym Ninita wrote Swedish lyrics entitled "Godmorgon, Mr. Eko". Alice Babs, Charles Normans orkester recorded it in Stockholm on September 7, 1951. The song was released on the 78 rpm records Metronome J 196 (in Sweden) and on Musica A 6905 (in Norway).

== Personal life ==
Born Jane Alexander, she was married to Wally Turzy from 1939 until his death in 1978 and had one daughter, Jane. She remarried in 1986 to Adam Zacher.

Turzy died in Branford, Florida.
