= Pat Bishow =

American film director

Pat Bishow is an American independent filmmaker and writer, and former drummer for The Mosquitos.

In 2015 he created a web series We Might Be Superheroes about two women that accidentally become superheroes. Comically known as "the odd couple in tights." It ran for 3 seasons on Amazon Prime.

His 2009 film is called The Adventures of C.C. Brite and stars Jessica Jolly. The story is a throw-back to the old girl detective books from the 60s (Nancy Drew/Trixie Beldon/Kate Aldrich/Honey West/etc.).

The latest film that he acted in, wrote and directed was It's a Haunted Happenin'! which was released in 2003. He is married and has a son whose name is Declan, named after Elvis Costello.

His largest and most successful movie series is "The Adventures of El Frenetico & Go-Girl."^{OCLC 39522664} They are about a luchador who is often too drunk to fight and a female martial arts master who always saves the day.

== Bibliography ==
- Gods in Spandex, Or, A Survivors' Account of 80's Cinema Obscura (2007/Succubus Press)

-Bishow contributed a piece on Soultangler.
