= Chauncey Howell =

American newscaster (1935–2021)

Chauncey D. Howell Jr. (July 15, 1935 – September 20, 2021) was an American newscaster, radio journalist, and print journalist; he was a five-time Emmy Award recipient. Howell was born in Easton, Pennsylvania, and attended Amherst College as a Classics major.

After a career at Women's Wear Daily, he worked in New York for WABC-TV and WNBC. Howell subsequently worked for News 12 Long Island. His print journalism appeared in The New York Times, Playboy, Cosmopolitan, Esquire, and McCall's.

Howell died on September 20, 2021, in his native Easton, Pennsylvania, aged 86.
