= Burning a Hole in My Mind =

Single by Connie Smith

from the album I Love Charley Brown
- B-side: "Only for Me"
- Released: September 1967
- Genre: Country
- Label: RCA Victor
- Songwriter(s): Cy Coben
- Producer(s): Bob Ferguson

Connie Smith singles chronology
"Cincinnati, Ohio" (1967)	"Burning a Hole in My Mind" (1967)	"Baby's Back Again" (1967)

"Burning a Hole in My Mind" is a single by American country music artist Connie Smith. Released in September 1967, the song reached #5 on the Billboard Hot Country Singles chart. The single was later released on Smith's 1968 album entitled I Love Charley Brown. The song was written by songwriter Cy Coben.

== Chart performance ==
Chart (1967)	Peak position
U.S. Billboard Hot Country Singles	5
