= Margarita Pracatan =

Cuban musician (1931–2020)

Margarita Pracatan (born Margarita Figueroa; 11 June 1931 – 23 June 2020) was a Cuban-born novelty singer, who became well-known in the UK, during the 1990s, when she performed regularly on television on Saturday Night Clive hosted by Clive James.

== Biography ==
Margarita Figueroa was born in Oriente, Santiago, Cuba. Her father, Buenaventura, was a union leader and her mother, Juana, was a school and piano teacher. She began to sing at home when she was three years old. Her family fled to the U.S. after the Cuban revolution, after initially being exiled to Venezuela. She worked in a store selling cosmetics at B. Altman and Company, then men's underwear at Saks Fifth Avenue while singing at night at clubs and restaurants.

She found success in the 1990s when she was booked on numerous occasions to appear on Clive James's television show in the UK, adopting the surname "Pracatan". James showed clips of her heavily Hispanic-inflected performances of pop hits (including Lionel Richie's "Hello" and "New York, New York") on his BBC series Saturday Night Clive. According to her website, Clive James discovered her on a Manhattan public-access television cable TV programme in 1994 and invited her to the UK to appear on his show. He sweet-talked her into believing he was serious, and she signed up. Although he never mocked her openly, his introductions to her end-of-show performances contained teasing irony. James once said of Pracatan, "She never lets the words or melody get in her way. She is us, without the fear of failure."

Pracatan toured regularly in the United Kingdom and Australia,also appearing as part of the Sydney Gay and Lesbian Mardi Gras festival during the mid-1990s. Pracatan appeared in an episode of The Real Housewives of New York City in 2019, performing a cover version of Luann de Lesseps’s "Money Can't Buy You Class". Radio disc jockey Martin Kelner also played her frequently on his BBC Night Network and BBC Radio 2 programmes.

Pracatan died of heart failure in New York in June 2020, aged 89. She was divorced (the marriage was in 1963) with one daughter, Maria.

== Discography ==
Year	Title	Label
1996	Live at the Palladium	RCA
1996	Hello (Maxi Single)	RCA
2000	Margarita Pracatan	IND
2003	The Best	IND
