= Shaving Cream (song) =

- Benny Bell on the cover of the album Shaving Cream

Single by Benny Bell

from the album Shaving Cream
- B-side: "The Girl From Chicago"
- Released: 1946 (re-released in 1975)
- Recorded: 1946
- Genre: Novelty/party record
- Length: 2:40
- Label: Vanguard
- Songwriter: Benny Bell
- Producer: Benny Bell

"Shaving Cream" is a song written by Benny Bell in 1946, and originally sung by Paul Wynn. It is a novelty song in which each verse ends with a mind rhyme of shit, the initial sh- transitioning into the refrain, "Shaving Cream".

An example of this can be found in the opening verse:

"I have a sad story to tell you
It may hurt your feelings a bit
Last night when I walked into my bathroom
I stepped in a big pile of ...shhhhh . . . aving cream."

The original version of "Shaving Cream" was issued on Bell's Cocktail Party Songs record label in 1946, with Phil Winston on vocals under the pseudonym Paul Wynn, and, as that name was also used by Bell, Winston's version has often been mistaken for Bell's, and has appeared on Benny Bell compilation albums more frequently than Bell's own version.

After the song began to be played on the Dr. Demento radio show in the 1970s, disc jockey Bruce Morrow on WNBC radio in New York also played it, resulting in "Shaving Cream" becoming the station's most requested record during the last week of 1974. Vanguard Records reissued the song in 1975, and it became a hit, peaking at No. 30 on the Billboard Hot 100 chart. Early copies of the 1975 Vanguard single credited Bell as the performer. However, after controversy ensued, the same recording was re-released with revised labels crediting Paul Wynn as performer.

A remake of "Shaving Cream" performed as a duet with Dr. Demento was released on the albums Dr. Demento's Dementia Royale and Dr. Demento's 25th Anniversary Collection. Dr. Demento occasionally performed the song live in concert with "Weird Al" Yankovic's band (Yankovic playing accordion). Another 1970s cover version was recorded by a reggae group, The Fabulous Five.

On the 2017 revival of The Gong Show, this song was performed as an intermission partway through each show, and was sung in audience sing-along fashion, led by a staff performer named Albert. However, the segment was discontinued in season two.

== See also ==
- Vanguard Records
- List of 1970s one-hit wonders in the United States
