= Freddy Schuman =

American baseball spectator

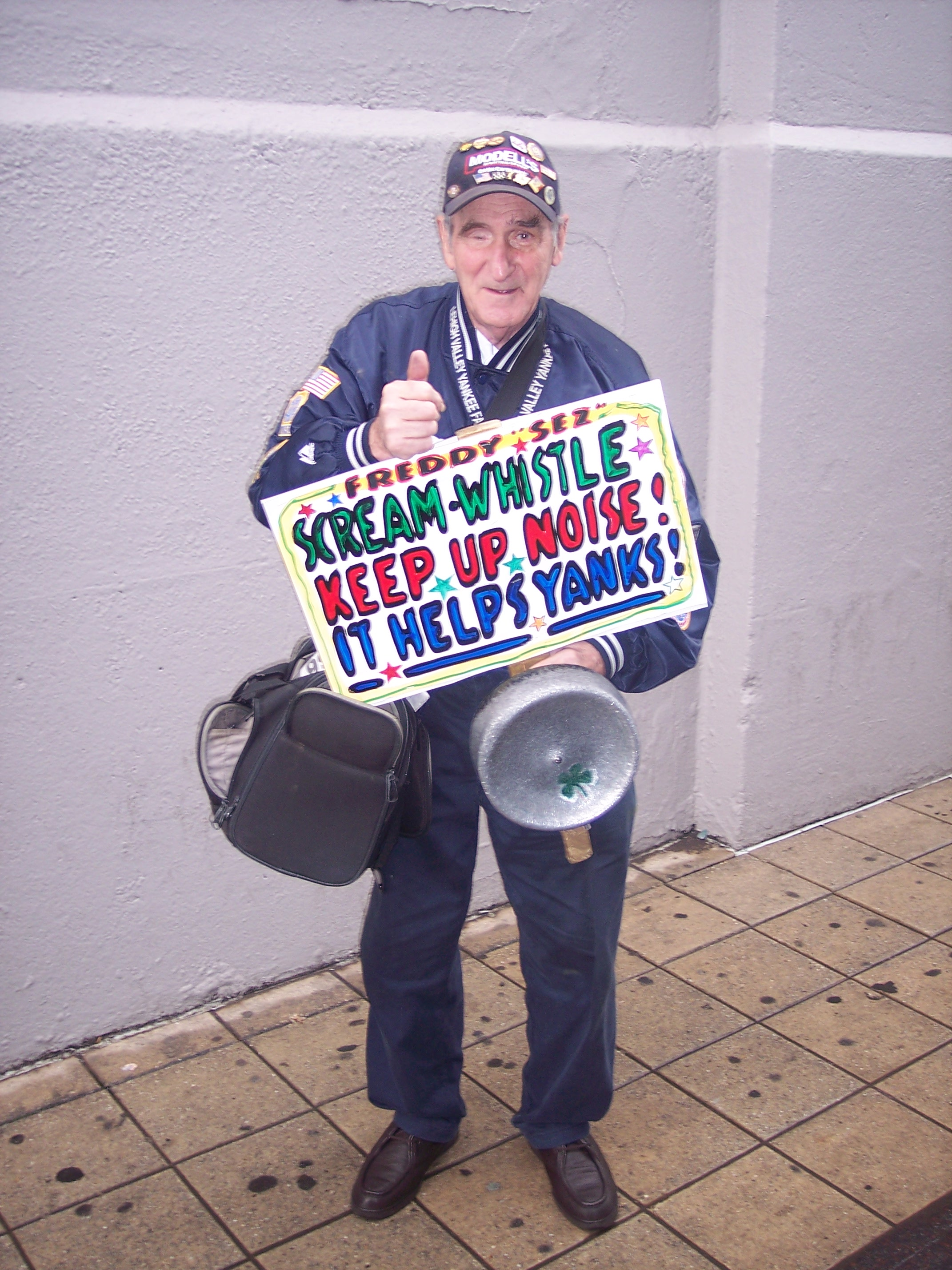
- Freddy Schuman holding one of his signs near the Bleachers entrance to Yankee Stadium, 2006
- Born: May 23, 1925; New York, United States
- Died: October 17, 2010 (aged 85); Manhattan, New York, United States
- Other name: Freddy Sez
- Known for: Unofficial promoter of the Yankees c. 1988 to 2010

Freddy Schuman (May 23, 1925 – October 17, 2010), better known as Freddy Sez or Freddy "Sez", was an American superfan of the New York Yankees. He was known for his activities in promoting the team and encouraging fan participation.

== Biography ==
Schuman was born on May 23, 1925, and was a resident of The Bronx for most of his life. When he was 9 years old, he suffered an accident during a stickball game, in which he lost the use of his right eye. From about 1988, until his death, he was an unofficial promoter for the Yankees.

== Yankees promotion ==
=== The pan ===
Schuman carried a frying pan with a shamrock painted on it, which he said "Brings 'em luck." Fans were encouraged to bang on the pan with a spoon to make noise. This made a distinctive sound that echoed throughout the stadium and could be heard in the background during TV broadcasts. One of his pans is on display at the National Baseball Hall of Fame and another is at the Yogi Berra Museum & Learning Center in New Jersey.

=== Signs ===
Schuman on Opening Day 2001

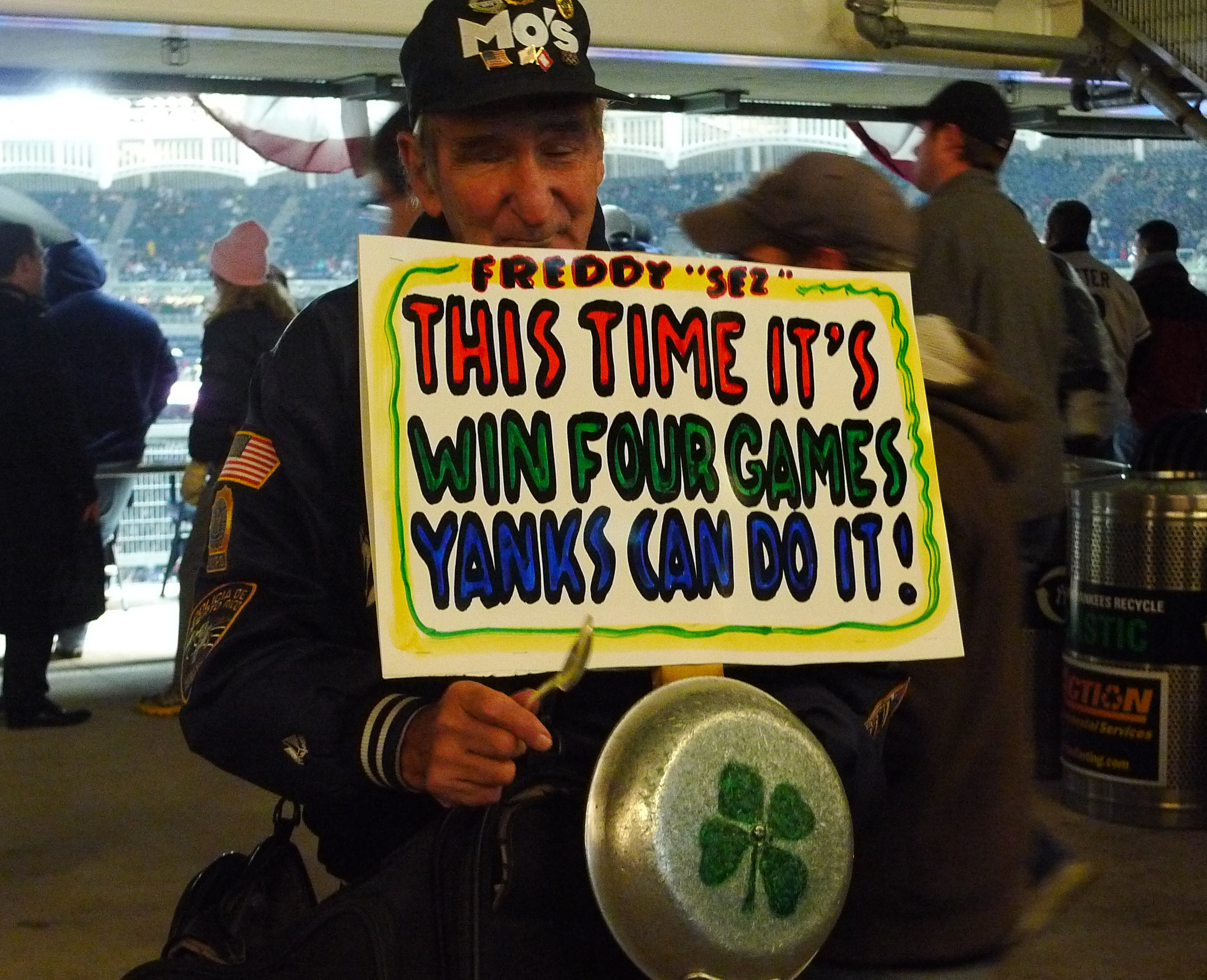
Schuman at Yankee Stadium during Game 1 of the 2009 ALCS.

Schuman also carried a number of colorful hand-painted signs adorned with messages to encourage the team and the fans. The signs usually began with "Freddy 'sez'". Some Freddy messages included "Again & Again Yankees Prove They Are Great", and "Fans, We Got To Help Yankees Out Of Slumps". Sometimes, Schuman would give the sign to a fan at the end of a game.

Schuman also took his signs and frying pan to other events, as shown below.

=== Route ===
Before the games, Schuman could be found outside Yankee Stadium. During the games, he moved throughout the stadium, making his way from the grandstand down to the main section, and finally to the field level.

=== Sponsorship ===
Schuman can be briefly seen in a baseball themed MasterCard commercial that aired during the 2007 Major League Baseball Home Run Derby. He can also be seen for a few seconds near the end of House of Pain's 1992 music video for their hit single "Jump Around". Schuman claimed his tickets circa 2003 were sponsored by Modell's Sporting Goods. After his death in 2010, Schuman can be seen briefly in a Nike Boom commercial, featuring Craig Robinson and Robinson Canó.

== Other teams ==
College basketball and football teams whose games Schuman had been known to attend and promote include the Manhattan College Jaspers, the Fordham University Rams, the Columbia University Lions, the Princeton University Tigers, and the Cornell University Big Red. In 2008, Freddy was spotted at the New York Giants parade in New York, commemorating their Super Bowl XLII victory.

== Death ==
Schuman died at the age of 85 at Lenox Hill Hospital on Sunday, October 17, 2010, after suffering a heart attack the previous Friday night. In a tribute, the Yankees displayed some of his memorabilia and held a moment of silence prior to Game 3 of the 2010 American League Championship Series.
