= Carol Shaya =

Israeli-born American model (born 1969)

- קרול שעיה
- Born: February 4, 1969 (age 57); Tel-Aviv, Israel
- Other name: Carol Shaya-Castro
- Known for: NYPD Officer from 1991 – March 7, 1995, actress, model, radio and television personality, personal trainer

Carol Shaya (born February 4, 1969) is an Israeli-born American former New York City police officer, whose employment was terminated after she appeared in the August 1994 issue of Playboy magazine. She is an actress who trained under Marilyn Fried at the Lee Strasberg Theater and appeared in the off-Broadway production of Grandma Sylvia's Funeral at the SoHo Playhouse. Shaya is currently a personal trainer, actress, and model living in West Hollywood, California. She is a member of the Screen Actors Guild.

== Personal life ==
Shaya was born in Tel-Aviv, Israel to a Greek Orthodox family and immigrated to America as a child. Her father and her ex-husband Charlie Castro also worked as police officers. Shaya divorced Castro on September 16, 1997, and has since dropped "Castro" from her name.

== Playboy appearance ==
In August 1994, Shaya, then an NYPD officer, appeared nude in Playboy after receiving authorization to engage in outside work from her Captain/Commanding Officer. On October 28, the NYPD filed departmental charges against Shaya seeking her termination for unauthorized off-duty employment and improper use of her uniform and the Police Department logo. Because she had received prior authorization, the Judge overturned the department's termination request and placed Shaya on modified duty on a temporary basis until the media stopped following her while on duty. On March 7, 1995, Police Commissioner William J. Bratton overturned the departmental judge's ruling and terminated Shaya anyway, saying her appearance in Playboy violated the City Charter and the department's rules.

In response, Shaya sued the department for US $10,000,000 for wrongful dismissal and gender discrimination. In her claim, she said that other, male, officers who appeared in pornographic films, not just softcore pictorials, were merely suspended, and not fired. Her lawsuit was criticized by Stanley Crouch in an American Enterprise Institute speech. The case, Shaya-Castro v. New York City Police Department, 649 N.Y.S.2d 711 (1996)., was decided against her, and upheld on appeal.

== Beaux Arts Ball Queen ==
The Beaux Arts Society (founded in 1857) crowned Shaya "Queen" of the Beaux Arts Ball, which was held on November 11, 1994, at The Liederkranz Club in Manhattan. Joe Franklin was crowned King at that event and the two of them reigned as Royal Family Members for one year. Shaya is a Life Member of the Beaux Arts Society.

== Later career ==
In 1994, Shaya appeared as Sergeant Witoshensky, a recurring role in the television police drama, New York Undercover. Shaya also starred as Detective Fine (lead) in the direct-to-video film Silent Prey in 1997. Shaya starred off-Broadway as Dori Grossman in Grandma Sylvia's Funeral at the SoHo Playhouse. In August 2004, The New York Times reported Shaya was selling real estate in the Queens borough of New York City. Shaya now resides in West Hollywood, California where she works as an actress and personal trainer.

== Television and radio appearances ==
Shaya's television appearances include having been a guest on Conan O'Brien, Tom Snyder, Howard Stern, Entertainment Tonight, Hard Copy, Extra!, E! Special "Sex On The Riviera", E! News Daily, The Girlee Show, Geraldo Rivera, American Journal, Today Show, Inside Edition, Good Day New York, Dateline, Live at Five, Queens Live, VH1 "Sex & Videotapes" and appearances on British and German television shows.

Shaya's radio appearances include having been a guest on Howard Stern, Scott & Todd, John Lander & Patti Steel, Ed Lover & Dr. Dre, Jeff Fox & Ken Webb, Rambling with John Gambling, AM Philadelphia with Amy Buckman, Broadway Bill Lee, and also British radio shows.
