= Dr. Demento 25th Anniversary Collection =

1996 compilation album

Compilation album by Various artists
- Released: 1996
- Genre: Comedy rock, Novelty songs
- Length: 1:55:00
- Label: Rhino Records
- Producer: Various

Professional ratings
Review scores
Source	Rating
allmusic	5/5 stars

Dr. Demento 25th Anniversary Collection is a release by radio disc jockey Dr. Demento to celebrate 25 years since the beginning of his radio career and novelty song show. It covers many of the novelty and comedy songs from the 1950s to the early 1990s, such as Shaving Cream by Benny Bell, to the then recent release of Smells Like Nirvana by "Weird Al" Yankovic, whose popularity was boosted by Demento. It is also a sequel to the previous album, Dr. Demento 20th Anniversary Collection.

== Track listing ==
=== Disc one ===
#	Title	Performer(s)	Time	Writer(s)	Year released
1	"Smells Like Nirvana"	Weird Al Yankovic	3:44	Kurt Cobain / Alfred Yankovic	1992
2	"Heartbreak Hotel"	Stan Freberg	2:27	Mae Boren Axton / Tommy Durden / Elvis Presley	1956
3	"The Curly Shuffle"	Jump 'N The Saddle Band	2:54	Peter Quinn	1983
4	"Rubber Biscuit"	The Chips	2:06	Charlie Johnson	1962
5	"The Martian Boogie"	Brownsville Station	4:18		1977
6	"Fast Food"	Stevens & Grdnic	2:22	Ron Stevens / Joy Grdnic	1982
7	"Car Phone"	Sheeler & Sheeler	2:49	Chip Davis / Bill Fries / Wade Sheeler / Karen Sheeler	1990
8	"Highly Illogical"	Leonard Nimoy	3:02		1968
9	"One More Minute"	Weird Al Yankovic	4:02	Alfred Yankovic	1985
10	"No, I Don't Wanna Do Dat"	The Happy Schnapps Combo	3:13	Jim Krueger	1992
11	"Dance of the Hours"	Spike Jones and his City Slickers	2:58	Amilcare Ponchielli	1949
12	"My Dead Dog Rover"	Hank, Stu, Dave & Hank	2:18		1977
13	"There's a New Sound"	Tony Burrello	2:23	Tony Burrello / Tom Murray	1953
14	"When I Was a Dinosaur"	Trout Fishing In America	2:41	Larry Armer / David Egan	1991
15	"The Old Philosopher"	Eddie Lawrence	3:15	Eddie Lawrence	1956
16	"I'm a Happy Boy"	Beat Farmers	1:17	Jeff Becker / Dane Conover	1985
17	"Tiptoe Through the Tulips"	Tiny Tim	1:51	Joe Burke / Al Dubin	1968
18	"Shaving Cream"	Benny Bell	2:12	Benny Bell	1946

=== Disc two ===
#	Title	Performer(s)	Time	Writer(s)	Year released
1	"Particle Man"	They Might Be Giants	1:56	John Flansburgh / John Linnell	1990
2	"Sensitive New Age Guys"	Christine Lavin	3:39	John Gorka / Christine Lavin	1990
3	"The Hunting Song"	Tom Lehrer	1:45	Tom Lehrer	1960
4	"Achy Breaky Song"	Weird Al Yankovic	3:21	Alfred Yankovic	1993
5	"In Heaven There is No Beer"	Clean Living	2:28		1972
6	"I Gotta Get A Fake I.D."	Barnes and Barnes with Friends	3:05	Artie Barnes	1980
7	"Peter the Meter Reader"	Meri Wilson	2:30	Meri Wilson	1981
8	"Everybody Wants My Fanny"	Benny Bell	2:08	Benny Bell	1949
9	"Entering Marion"	John Forster	2:12	John Foster	1993
10	"'Cause I'm a Blonde"	Julie Brown	2:15	Julie Brown / Charles Coffey / Dennis Poore	1989
11	"Leader of the Laundromat"	The Detergents	3:12	Lee Pockriss / Paul Vance	1964
12	"Song of the Sewer"	Art Carney	2:37	Matt Dubey	1954
13	"Mr. Custer"	Larry Verne	2:11	Fred Darian / Al DeLory / Joseph VanWinkle	1960
14	"Second Week of Deer Camp"	Da Yoopers	2:49	Jim DeCaire / Joe Potila	1987
15	"Timothy"	The Buoys	2:46	Rupert Holmes	1970
16	"Stardrek"	Bobby Pickett & Peter Ferrara	4:52	Peter Ferrara / Bobby Pickett	1976
17	"Three Little Pigs"	Green Jellÿ	4:21	Marc Levinthal / Bill Manspeaker	1993
18	"Moose Turd Pie"	Utah Phillips	5:20		1973
