= Yooper =

Yooper may refer to:

- Yoopers, people from the Upper Peninsula of Michigan (the "UP")
- Yooper dialect: The dialect of English speech used by the inhabitants of the Upper Peninsula
- Da Yoopers: A comedy–musical group from the area of the Upper Peninsula
