= ACRS =

ACRS may refer to:

- Accelerated Cost Recovery System, a historical 1981 accounting practice that preceded the 1986 (&forward) "Modified Accelerated Cost Recovery System" (MACRS)
- Air Cushion Restraint System, an early airbag implementation by General Motors
- Area Coverage Rate (Sustained), a measurement of the effectiveness of Mine countermeasures
- Ancient Culture Research Society, a non-profit organisation focusing on archaeological research
- Advisory Committee on Reactor Safeguards, part of the Nuclear Regulatory Commission
- Arms Control and Regional Security in the Middle East, a working group formed as a result of the Madrid Conference of 1991
- Asian Conference on Remote Sensing, a yearly event spearheaded by the Asian Association of Remote Sensing (AARS), Asia's largest society of remote sensing scientists and professionals
- Astrographic Catalog Reference Stars, a star catalog published by the U. S. Naval Observatory
- Australian Camellia Research Society, a society with a register of Camellia's bred in Australia
