= Rusty Chevrolet =

Single by Da Yoopers

from the album Culture Shock
- B-side: "Smeltin' USA"
- Released: 1986
- Genre: Novelty, Christmas
- Length: 2:43
- Label: You Guys
- Songwriters: Jim DeCaire; Joe Potila
- Producers: Jim DeCaire; Joe Potila

Music video
- "Rusty Chevrolet" on YouTube

"Rusty Chevrolet" is a song by American novelty music band Da Yoopers. The song was released in 1986 and can be found on the band's second album Culture Shock. It is a novelty Christmas song set to the melody of "Jingle Bells".

== History ==
Da Yoopers released "Rusty Chevrolet" in late 1986 following their first album Yoopanese. Band members Jim DeCaire and Joe Potila wrote and produced the song. It was issued as a single with "Smeltin' USA" on the B-side, and later appeared on the band's second album Culture Shock. At the time of its release, the band sold copies of the single for two dollars, with half of that amount being donated to the local Salvation Army. After its release, the song became popular on stations in the Upper Peninsula of Michigan and in Wisconsin, with WIFC of Wausau, Wisconsin alone ordering over 200 copies due to listener demand. In late 2024, the song regained popularity on social medias such as Instagram and YouTube, accompanied by videos made in the driving simulator BeamNG.drive.

The band later used profits from the song to build their own recording studio in their hometown of Ishpeming, Michigan.

"Rusty Chevrolet" is about a man's struggles with his old Chevrolet car (depicted in the music video as a fifth-generation Chevrolet Impala), and its lyrics are set to the melody of the Christmas song "Jingle Bells". The song lists all the things wrong with the car, except for the radio: "It's OK."
