= Da Turdy Point Buck =

1989 song by Bananas At Large

Song by Bananas At Large
- Released: 1989
- Length: 5:10
- Songwriter: Mike Skurek

"Da Turdy Point Buck" is a 1989 song by the Wisconsin group Bananas At Large. The song was popular during deer hunting season, received radio airplay, and was released as an album with other songs. It is about hunting a large buck.

== Production ==
The group Bananas At Large consists of Shane Totten, Gary Nilsen, and Mike Skurek in Amherst Junction, Wisconsin. The song was created in 1989 and their inspiration for their group name was bananas on Nilsen's table. Nilsen said, "When you're not inhibited, you do anything and go bananas." Totten taught art and science at Pacelli High School, Nilsen tuned pianos at the University of Wisconsin–Stevens Point while he was the group's manager, and Skurek was a teacher at a junior high school and wrote the songs. The song is about a hunt for a large buck.

== Radio airtime ==
Every deer hunting season, Nilsen received a large amount of fan mail and requests for an album. People frequently requested the song on radio stations and their address was the most requested. The song was in the number one spot on a radio show hosted by Dr. Demento in 1993. In 1994, the group's address was the most requested on Dr. Demento's radio show. It has had radio airtime in multiple states. KGNU president and general manager Karl Rene De Rouen said that the best feedback in some months were from duck and deer hunters. The group received a letter from Belgium radio station Radio Scorpio. Totten compared the song's success to the song "White Christmas".

== Album release and promotion ==
The song was released on cassettes and CDs with a phone number for a catalog containing hats, posters, t-shirts, and knives. The group planned on releasing an alarm clock with antlers and 30-packs of beer. The album has "Da Turdy Point Buck" along with "Spring Fishin", "I Hate Cockroaches", "Grandma's Revenge", "Deer Widows Blues", "Da Farm News Report", and "Vee Kom Froom Veeskonsin". Some of the songs were initially released as singles. The songs contain belches and animal sounds that were recorded in a barn. A sequel album titled Turdy Point Buck II, Da Sequel was released in 1996, and a second sequel album titled Turdy Point Buck III - Da Turd Album was released in 1999.

== See also ==
- "Second Week of Deer Camp", another 1980s novelty song about deer hunting, recorded by Da Yoopers
