= Particle Man =

Song by They Might Be Giants

from the album Flood
- Published: 1990
- Released: 1990
- Recorded: 1989, Skyline Studio, New York City
- Genre: Alternative rock, polka
- Length: 1:59
- Label: Elektra
- Songwriters: John Flansburgh, John Linnell
- Producer: They Might Be Giants

"Particle Man" is a song by American alternative rock duo They Might Be Giants, released and published in 1990. The song is the seventh track on the band's third album, Flood. It has become one of the band's most popular songs, despite never having been released as a single. John Linnell and John Flansburgh performed the song, backed by a metronome, for their 1990 Flood promotional video. Although it was released over a decade before the band began writing children's music, "Particle Man" is sometimes cited as a particularly youth-appropriate TMBG song, and a precursor to their first children's album, No!, which was not explicitly educational. The song is partially influenced by the theme of the 1967 Spider-Man TV series.

They Might Be Giants' official YouTube account has the user name "ParticleMen", derived from the song title.

== Lyrical content ==
The song describes four different "men": Particle Man, a microscopic being whose attributes are deemed "not important" enough to be discussed lyrically; Triangle Man, a belligerent entity who hates Particle Man, fights him, and wins; Universe Man, a kinder being, who is the size of the universe, and has a watch with hands relevant to the age of the universe ("He's got a watch with a minute hand, a millennium hand, and an eon hand"); and Person Man, a "degraded" being who lives in a garbage can, somehow feels worthless, and who is also despised, challenged, and defeated by Triangle Man. The song's author, John Linnell, denied the assertion that there is a deeper meaning to "Particle Man", stating on a phone interview filmed for Gigantic (A Tale of Two Johns) that "nothing is missing from your understanding of 'Particle Man'". Band member John Flansburgh described it as "just a song about characters in the most obvious sense" and claims that the lyrics are not intended to allude to real people, though Linnell later said that "Triangle Man was based on a friend's observation that Robert Mitchum looked like an evil triangle when he took his shirt off in Night of the Hunter. Nothing else not explicitly stated need be inferred."

== Video ==
Both "Particle Man" and They Might Be Giants' cover of "Istanbul (Not Constantinople)" were made into music videos featured on the Warner Bros. animated series, Tiny Toon Adventures and The Plucky Duck Show. Both appeared in the episode "Tiny Toons Music Television". In the video for "Particle Man", Plucky Duck portrays both the title role (as a pro-wrestler) and Person Man (after discarding his outfit), while Triangle Man and Universe Man are presented as massive wrestlers. The video also includes cameos by The Crusher from the Looney Tunes short Bunny Hugged, Hamton J. Pig as a wrestling announcer who lip-syncs the song's lyrics, and Dizzy Devil playing the accordion.

The music videos for "Particle Man" and "Istanbul (Not Constantinople)" are credited with having introduced young fans to the band. Although they were not official music videos, the Tiny Toons selections warranted inclusion on the band's 1999 video compilation, Direct from Brooklyn.

== Influence and usage ==
In addition to the Tiny Toons Adventures music video above, "Particle Man" has been performed by schoolchildren on multiple occasions. In two such instances, the band has obtained recordings of the performances and released them to their fans and the general public. A cover entitled "Schoolchildren Singing 'Particle Man'", recorded by a music teacher at an elementary school, appeared on the band's Dial-A-Song phone line, as well as their 1997 compilation Then: The Earlier Years. John Linnell stated that this was his favorite version of the song. Another rendition was done by the fifth graders of the Kingsley Montessori School in Boston. The recording was accompanied by an animated video made by the students, which the band uploaded to YouTube.

In the Marvel Comics series X-Factor, writer Peter David referenced "Particle Man" as the source song for a fictional parody by "Weird Al" Yankovic about the character Multiple Man. A partial verse, which discussed Multiple Man's ability to create duplicates of himself, was presented as a radio broadcast in issue #73. The song was also a minor inspiration to author Terry Pratchett. One of his recurring Discworld characters, Foul Ole Ron, frequently mutters "millennium hand and shrimp". This was a result of Pratchett feeding various texts to a text-generation computer program, and this phrase was a result of merging this song's lyrics (which mention a "millennium hand") with a Chinese takeaway menu.

A cover of the song was used, in part, for advertisements and previews for the video game Geometry Wars: Galaxies. In reference to the nature of Geometry Wars, the part of the song about "Triangle Man" is particularly stressed.

The single "Particle Man" appears on "Dr. Demento's 25th Anniversary Collection," released in 1995 on Rhino Records.

== Personnel ==
=== They Might Be Giants ===
- John Linnell – vocals, keyboards, accordion
- John Flansburgh – guitar

=== Additional musicians ===
- Alan Bezozi – drums
- Skyline Studio staff – handclaps

=== Production ===
- Roger Moutenot – mixing
- They Might Be Giants – producer
