= Chevrolet Impala (fifth generation) =

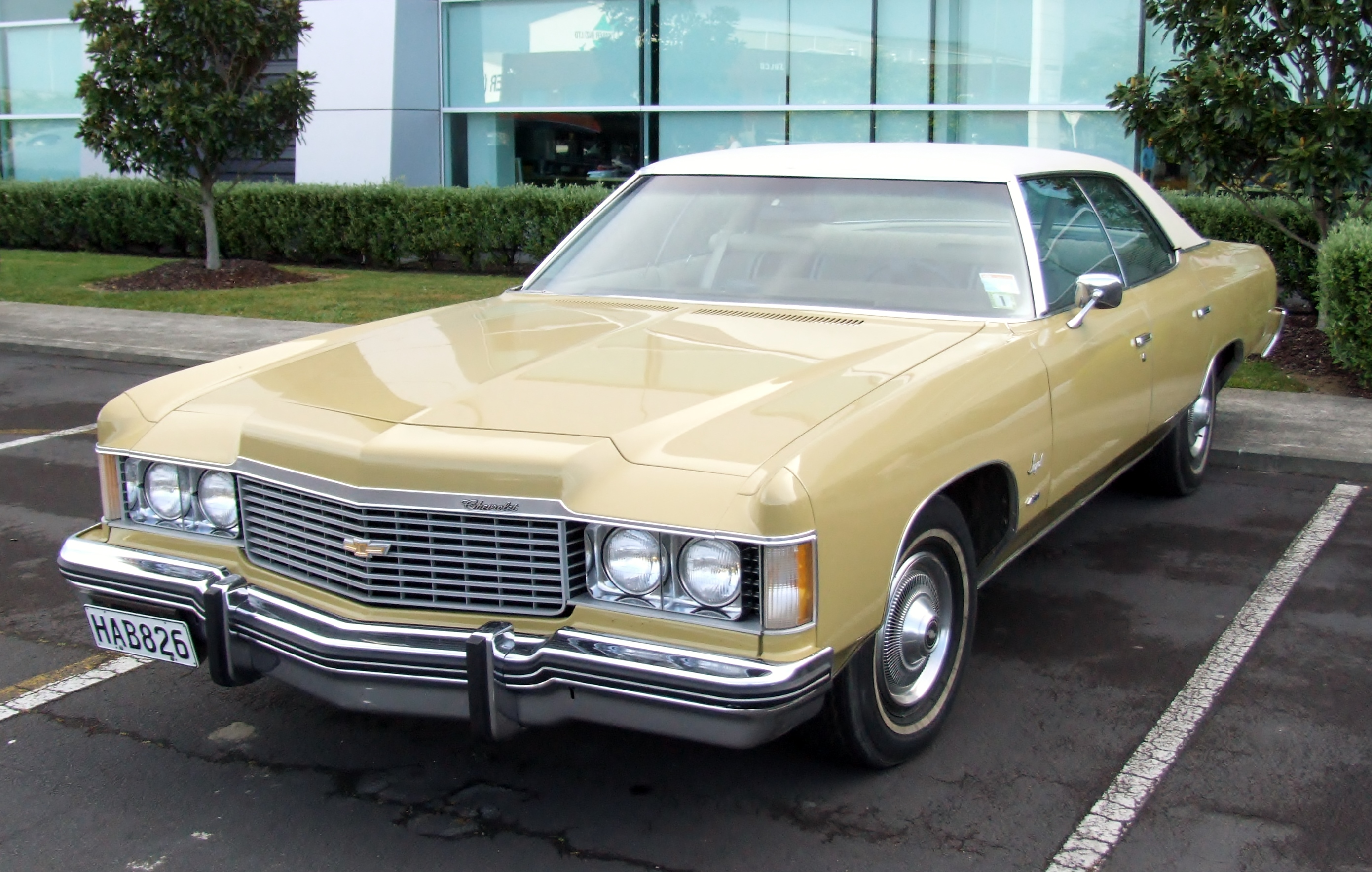
- 1974 Chevrolet Impala Sport Sedan

Overview
- Manufacturer: Chevrolet (General Motors)
- Production: 1970–1976
- Model years: 1971–1976
- Assembly: United States: Doraville, Georgia (Doraville Assembly); Janesville, Wisconsin (Janesville Assembly); South Gate, California (South Gate Assembly); St. Louis, Missouri (St. Louis Assembly); North Tarrytown, New York (North Tarrytown Assembly); Wilmington, Delaware (Wilmington Assembly); Canada: Oshawa, Ontario (Oshawa Car Assembly)

Body and chassis
- Body style: 2-door convertible; 2-door Sport Coupe (semi fastback hardtop); 2-door Custom Coupe (formal hardtop); 4-door hardtop; 4-door sedan; 4-door station wagon
- Layout: Front-engine, rear-wheel-drive
- Platform: B-body
- Related: Chevrolet Caprice; Chevrolet Bel Air; Chevrolet Biscayne

Powertrain
- Engine: 250 cu in (4.1 L) Turbo-Thrift I6; 350 cu in (5.7 L) Turbo Fire V8; 400 cu in (6.6 L) Turbo Fire V8; 402 cu in (6.6 L) Turbo-Jet 400 V8; 454 cu in (7.4 L) Turbo-Jet V8
- Transmission: 2-speed Powerglide automatic; 3-speed manual; 3-speed Turbo-Hydramatic automatic

Dimensions
- Wheelbase: 121.5 in (3,086 mm)
- Length: 222.9 in (5,662 mm)
- Width: 79.5 in (2,019 mm)
- Height: 53.7–54.4 in (1,364–1,382 mm)

Chronology
- Predecessor: Chevrolet Impala (fourth generation)
- Successor: Chevrolet Impala (sixth generation)

The fifth generation of the Chevrolet Impala is a line of full-size cars produced by Chevrolet from the 1971 to 1976 model years. The largest generation of the model line, the fifth-generation Impala grew to a 121.5-inch wheelbase (125 inches for station wagons)

The Impala was offered as a four-door pillared sedan, four-door hardtop (sport sedan), two-door custom coupe (sharing its formal roofline with the Caprice), two-door sport coupe (semi-fastback roofline, shared with other B-body coupes), and two-door convertible.

By the end of its production, the fifth-generation Impala had transitioned from a higher-trim version of the full-size Chevrolet sedan line to its base vehicle, as Chevrolet had ended sales of the Biscayne and Bel Air in the United States. For 1977, the Impala became the first primary sedan line of the Big Three automakers to undergo downsizing.

== History ==
=== Overview ===
The 1971 redesigned B-body would be the largest car ever offered by Chevrolet. All 1971 Chevrolet engines featured lower compression ratios to permit the use of regular leaded, low lead or unleaded gasoline of at least 91 octane rating per GM corporate mandate in anticipation of the catalytic converters planned for 1975 and later models which necessitated the use of unleaded fuel. A high-performance big block V8 was available in the form of the Turbo-Jet 454, which produced 365 hp in 1971, but power decreased as the years went along. The 1970s marked the impact of the 1973 energy crisis with gasoline prices doubling from 1973 through 1979 and industry car sales plummeted 20 percent between 1973 and 1974. For the first time in recent history, annual passenger car travel in the U.S. declined. The Impala's sales dropped to 176,376 units in 1975, the weakest since its introduction in 1958. An Econominder gauge package was offered for 1975 and 1976 models.

=== 1971 ===
1971 Impala models offered the same body styles as previous years. Newly standard features included power front disc brakes, inside hood release, and a revised Astro-Ventilation system that utilized air distribution grills in the trunklid. The new body featured a double panel roof for improved rollover protection and flush exterior door handles - both features previously introduced on the 1970½ Camaro.

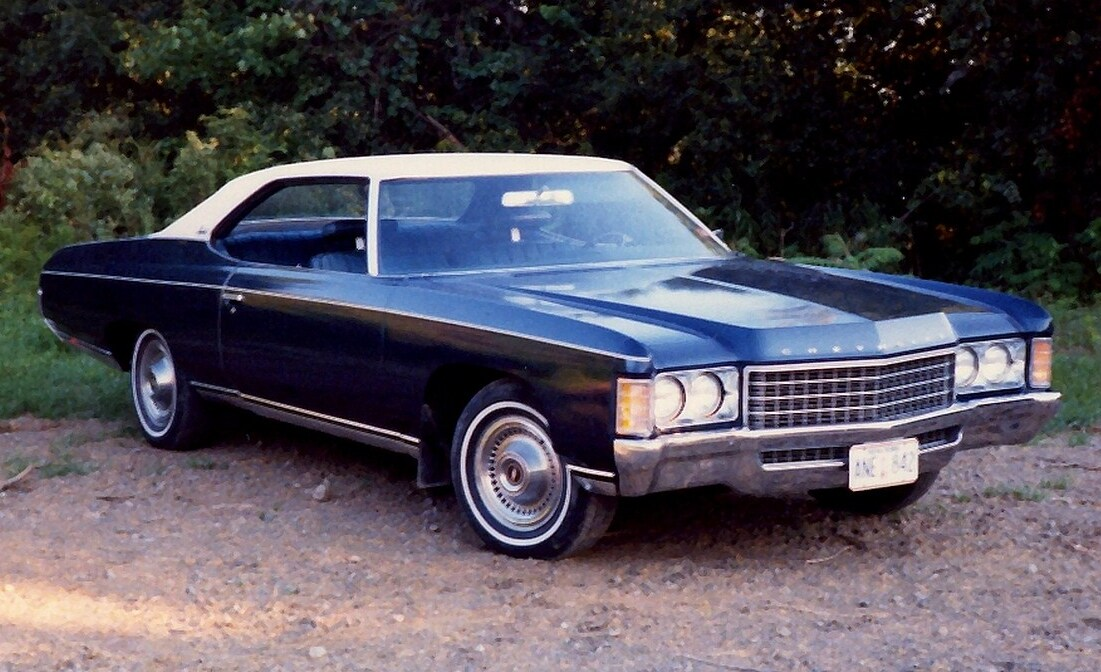
1971 Impala Sport Coupe

Engine offerings included the base 145-horsepower, 250 cubic-inch Turbo Thrift six-cylinder (available only on the Impala four-door sedan and Sport Coupe, as well as the lower-line Biscayne and Bel Air sedans) and 245-horsepower 350 cubic-inch Turbo Fire V-8 (standard on Impala Sport Sedan, Sport Coupe, Custom Coupe, convertible and Kingswood wagon, and optional on the sedan). Optional engines included the 255-horsepower 400 cubic-inch Turbo Fire V-8 (the standard Caprice and Kingswood Estate engine), 300-horsepower 400 cubic-inch Turbo Jet V8 and 365-horsepower 454 cubic-inch V-8. Early in the model year, all Impalas came standard with three-speed column shift manual transmissions and manual steering as standard equipment, with power steering and one of two automatic transmissions optional. During the first months of the model year, the three-speed Turbo-Hydramatic automatic transmission was optional with all engines while the two-speed Powerglide could be ordered with the 250 6 or 350 V-8s. At mid-year the Turbo-Hydramatic and variable-ratio power steering became standard equipment on all V-8 powered full-sized Chevrolets.

Station wagons featured a 'clamshell' design where the rear power-operated glass slid up into the roof as the tailgate (manually or with power assist), dropped below the load floor. The power tailgate, the first of its kind, ultimately supplanted the manual tailgate which required marked effort to lift from storage. This design was shared with other full-sized GM wagons from Pontiac, Oldsmobile and Buick. Subsequent generations reverted to the door-gate style for its full-size wagons. As expected, 1971 Impala production was well below 1970 totals due to the 67-day corporate wide strike at General Motors that began in September, 1970 after initial 1971-model production began and would not end until November. Impala production ended up at 427,000 units including 2,300 with six-cylinder engines and 425,400 with V8 with other series production totals including Caprice, 91,300; Biscayne, 37,600; Bel Air, 20,000; and station wagons (all series), 91,300.

=== 1972 ===
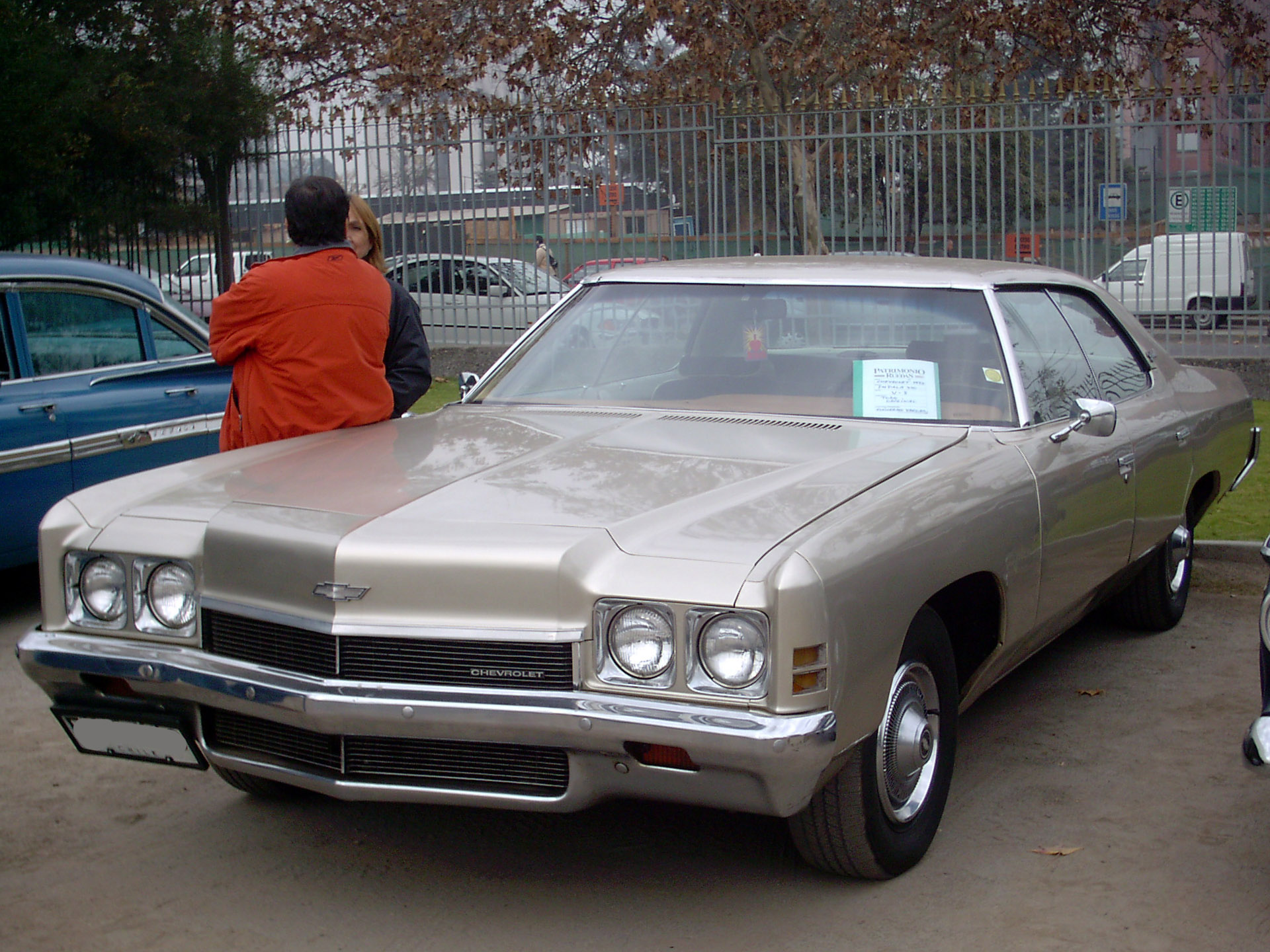
1972 Chevrolet Impala Sport Sedan

The 1972 Impala introduced a lower height grille which extended below the bumper and revised taillights now set in the bumper. 1972 saw the last Impala convertible, the following year moving to the top-of-the-line Caprice Classic. The Impala ragtop sold 6,456 units, placing fourth with just under 9% of the market, right behind the Corvette 6,508, and the Cutlass Supreme's 11,571, while remaining ahead of the Mustang's 6,401. Total Impala production for 1972 ended up at 597,500 units and other series totals included Caprice, 178,500; Biscayne (in its final year), 20,500; Bel Air, 41,900; and station wagons, 171,700. The 250-cubic-inch six-cylinder engine was offered in Impala four-door sedans and sport coupes along with a three-speed manual transmission and manual steering at the very beginning of the model year with 1,500 Impala sixes built. After the short run of early-1972 six-cylinder Impalas were built in the fall of 1971, the six-cylinder engine and three-speed manual transmission were relegated to low-line Biscayne and Bel Air sedans. For most of the 1972 model year, all Impalas were V-8 powered and came standard with Turbo Hydramatic transmission, power steering and power front disc brakes. The standard Impala engine was now the 165-net 350-cubic-inch Turbo Fire V8 with optional engines including the 170-horsepower, 400-cubic-inch Turbo Fire V-8 (the base Caprice/Kingswood Estate engine), 240-horsepower, 400-cubic-inch Turbo Jet V-8 (rated at 215 horsepower on station wagons) or the 270-horsepower, 454-cubic-inch Turbo Jet V-8 – these were the engine offerings in 49 states; in California the only engines offered were the 165-horsepower 350 and 170-horsepower 400 Turbo Fire small-block V8s due to that state's much stricter emission regulations. The Astro Ventilation system was redesigned for 1972 with the vents relocated from the trunk lid to the doorjambs for improved reliability and efficiency over the troublesome 1971 system that was a major source of complaints from owners to Chevrolet and its dealers.

=== 1973 ===
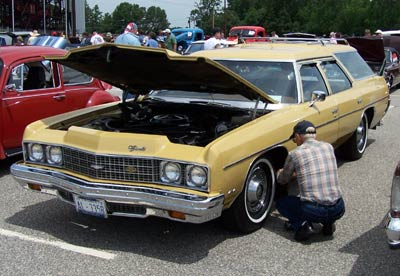
1973 Chevrolet Impala Wagon

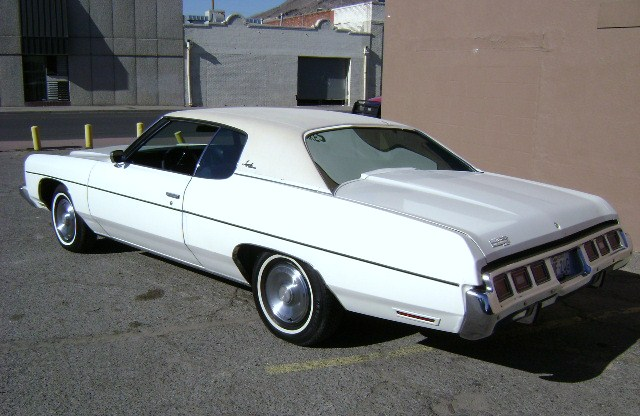
1973 Impala Custom Coupe

1973 Impalas featured a larger, shock-absorbing front bumper due to new federal mandates which required 5-mile-per-hour (8.0 km/h) impact protection. The chassis was tweaked for better roadability, and new square taillights were mounted in the carry-over rear bumper. With the convertible now moved to the top-line Caprice Classic series, (continuing through 1975) Impalas were now all closed body styles for the first time in the nameplate's history and the station wagon known as the Kingswood since 1969 rejoined the Impala series. A 145-horsepower 350 cubic-inch Turbo Fire V-8 engine, Turbo Hydramatic transmission, variable ratio power steering and power front disc brakes were standard on all Impalas. Optional engines in all models included a 175-horsepower 350 Turbo Fire V8 with four-barrel carburetor and 245-horsepower 454 Turbo Jet V8; while the Impala Custom coupe, Sport Sedan and station wagons could be ordered with the 165-horsepower 400 Turbo Fire V8 that was standard on that year's Caprice Classic series. All engines were offered nationwide in 1973.

In 1973, General Motors equipped approximately 1,000 1973 Chevrolet Impala Sedans with their experimental Air Cushion Restraint System (ACRS), which was an early prototype of an airbag system. ACRS employed a driver's side airbag that was housed in a unique four-spoke steering wheel, as well as a passenger side airbag. Due to the passenger side airbag, ACRS-equipped Impalas featured a modified instrument panel from an Oldsmobile 88. The passenger side airbag was a "dual-stage" unit that used impact sensors in order to determine the amount of force to use when deploying the airbag, based on the severity of the impact. All ACRS-equipped Impalas featured a unique green exterior paint scheme, and had a reinforced chassis from the police-spec Impala, as well as a 350 cubic inch (5.7 liter) V8 Chevrolet small-block engine from the Chevrolet Corvette (C3). All examples of these Impalas were sold directly to fleet buyers, and were not sold to the general public. While General Motors featured a version of the Air Cushion Restraint System in certain Buick, Cadillac, and Oldsmobile vehicles manufactured in the 1970s, Chevrolet would not begin to equip their vehicles with airbags until approximately 1990. One of the examples of an ACRS-equipped 1973 Impala was used on the television sitcom Seinfeld, where it was driven by Cosmo Kramer (played by Michael Richards) in several episodes. Only one example of the ACRS-equipped 1973 Impala is known to still exist, and is owned by an automotive safety expert from Maryland.

=== 1974 ===
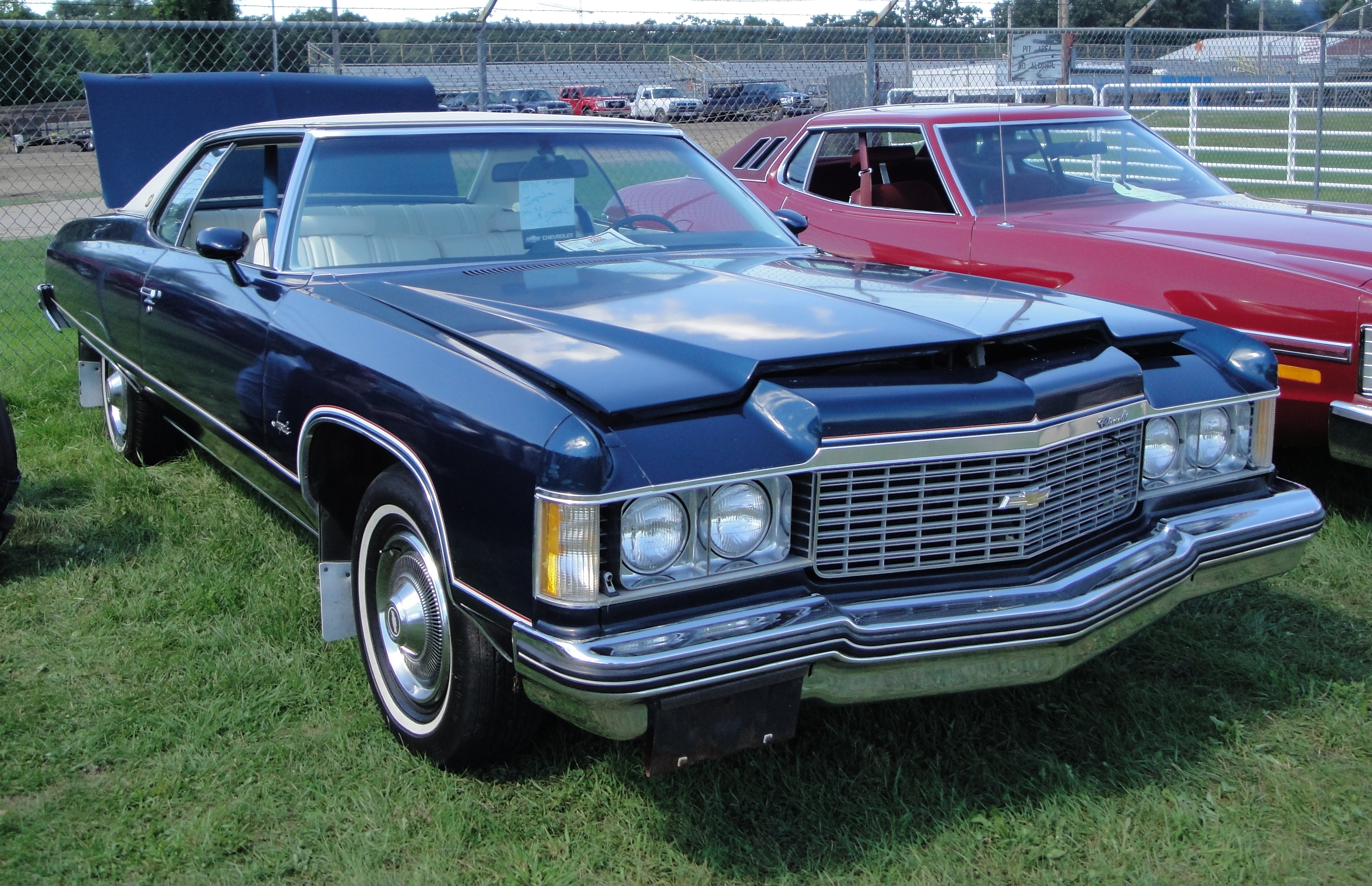
1974 Impala Sport Coupe Spirit of America Limited edition

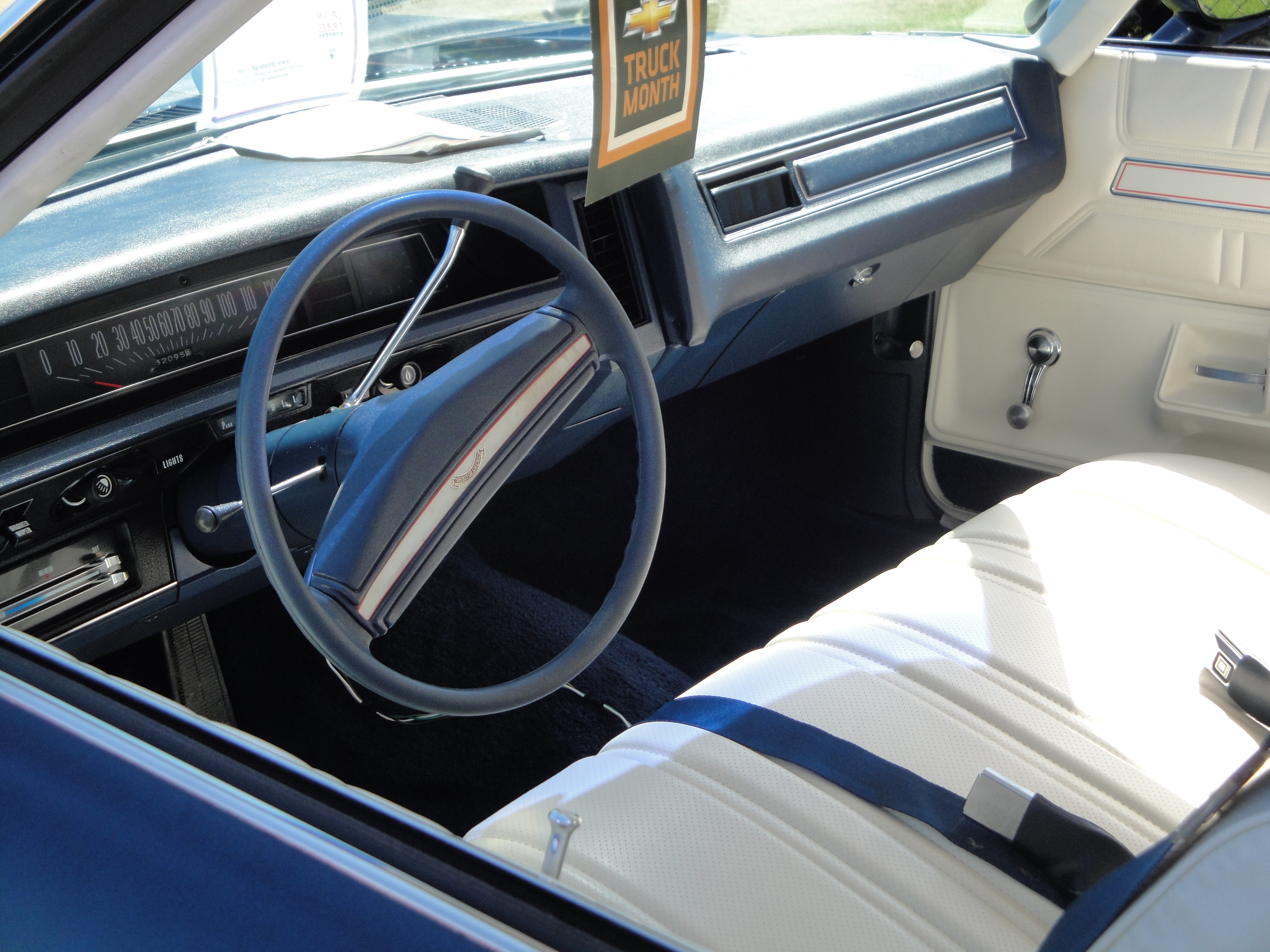
1974 Impala Sport Coupe Spirit of America edition interior

For 1974, the rear bumper of Impalas and other full-sized Chevrolets incorporated shock absorbing cylinders to meet the upgraded bumper standards with new taillights above the bumper, separated by the license plate and fuel filler. The front end featured a new grille and headlight bezels, a new header panel, and a bumper with a drop down center section. The marker lights moved back up beside the headlamps.

A limited-edition Spirit of America package was offered in 1974 on Sport Coupe models; primarily an appearance package, it featured white body paint, a white full vinyl top, white upholstery with red or blue trim, color-keyed seat belts and floormats, special wheel covers, optional white rally wheels, sports-styled dual remote outside rear view mirrors, a vinyl body side molding insert, and red pin-striping. Special fender and dashboard badges announced the package to passers-by and passengers.

This was the only year of the 1971–1976 models the Impala had a different front end design than the Caprice Classic, as other years used either a grille insert or previous year Caprice front to distinguish the two. The rooflines of the Impala coupes were revised. For 1974 the Custom Coupe was no longer a hardtop, with large fixed rear quarter glass and a thick B-pillar. The Sport Coupe, still a pillar-less hardtop, now used larger roll-down quarter glass like that of the 1971-73 Custom Coupe, and had a narrower, fastback style, flat back window similar to the 1966-68 Caprice coupes. The four-door sedan, four-door hardtop Sports Sedan and station wagons used carryover rooflines from 1973.

Engine offerings included the standard 145-horsepower 350 Turbo Jet V-8 on sedans and coupes, optional 150- and 180-horsepower 400 Turbo Fire V8s (the latter standard on Impala wagons), and 235-horsepower 454 Turbo Jet V8. In California, a 155-horsepower 350 V-8 with four-barrel carburetor was standard and the only engine options there were the 180-horsepower 400 and 454 V-8s.

=== 1975 ===
The 1975 Impala used a 1974 carried-over Caprice front end, with a grille insert and emblem change. The Caprice model carried a new front end with a swept back style header panel with recessed headlight buckets, a new hood, and new fenders. Also in 1975 upholstery, door panels and the dashboard were revised as were the radio and climate control graphics. Speedometers read up to 100 miles per hour (160 km/h), and added kilometers per hour. 1975 officially debuted a high-energy (HEI) electronic ignition system. Catalytic converters were also introduced as were several new options, including an Econominder gauge package, intermittent wipers, and a divided 50-50 bench seat (with a choice of sport cloth or vinyl trim).

A Landau appearance package was new for 1975. It featured an elk-grained landau vinyl roof (with a chrome band across the roof), a choice of special paint colors, sports-styled dual remote outside rearview mirrors, color-keyed wheel covers, a vinyl bodyside molding insert, and pin-striping. Inside were color-keyed seat belts and floormats; fender and dashboard emblems rounded out the package. (An identical trim package was also sold on the Caprice model.) Sport Coupe models were discontinued after the 1975 model year, leaving the redesigned Custom Coupe, with its wide "B" pillar and fixed rear window, the only 2-door Impala available in 1976. Engine offerings were similar to 1974 except that the 400 Turbo Fire V-8 was now only offered in four-barrel 180-horsepower form and the 454 Turbo Jet V-8 was no longer offered in California.

=== 1976 ===
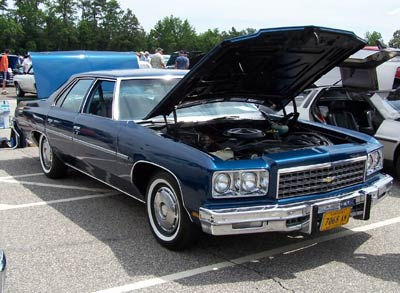
1976 Impala 4-door sedan

The 1976 Impala used a previous year Caprice nose, with a new "egg crate" grille insert. The Impala had round headlamps while the Caprice used the new quad rectangular ones. Engine offerings were the same as 1975 in both 49-state and California offerings. This was the final year for the four-door hardtop sedan, the big block 454 V-8 now yielding 225 horsepower, and the station wagon clamshell tailgate. The pillarless Impala Sport Coupe faded out of the lineup; a formal-roof Custom Coupe was the only Impala two-door. After 1976, the four-door hardtop body style also would disappear. Measuring more than 222 inches overall on a 121.5-inch wheelbase, the Impala ranked as the last of truly big Chevys. Full-size cars made the most of their perimeter frame and full coil spring suspension to deliver a smooth ride. The interior had such luxuries as simulated rosewood vinyl trim on the instrument panel, steering wheel, and doors. Impalas rode steel-belted radial tires and carried an automatic transmission, power brakes, and variable-ratio power steering. The standard bench seat could be replaced by a 50/50 split front seat, as in 1975. The Landau model, for both Caprice and Impala, continued into 1976 as before. A lighted visor vanity mirror was new to the options list.

A lower-priced Impala "S" series, available only as a four-door sedan, was introduced this year for the United States market and functioned as a replacement for the Bel Air, which was dropped after the 1975 model year. The trim and standard features were similar to that of the departed Bel Air series (although this model used the same triple rear taillights as the regular Impala, unlike the twin-taillight setup of the Bel Air). The Impala "S" was sold primarily to fleet and government customers where luxury was not a concern, although the car was available for purchase by private customers who sought basic low-cost transportation with the convenience of a V-8 powered full-size automobile.

== Engines ==
Small-block V8:

- 350 cu in (5.7 L) 250 bhp (186 kW; 253 PS) to 350 bhp (261 kW; 355 PS) Turbo Fire
- 400 cu in (6.6 L) 255 bhp (190 kW; 259 PS) to 265 bhp (198 kW; 269 PS) Turbo Fire

Big-block V8:

- 454 cu in (7.4 L) 345 bhp (257 kW; 350 PS) to 390 bhp (291 kW; 395 PS) Turbo-Jet

Six-cylinder I6 inline:

- 292 cu in (4.8 L) 175 bhp (130 kW; 177 PS) to 195 bhp (145 kW; 198 PS) Turbo-Thrift

== See also ==
- Chevrolet Caprice
- Chevrolet Bel Air
- Chevrolet Biscayne
- Fear & Loathing in Las Vegas
