= Chevrolet Impala (fourth generation) =

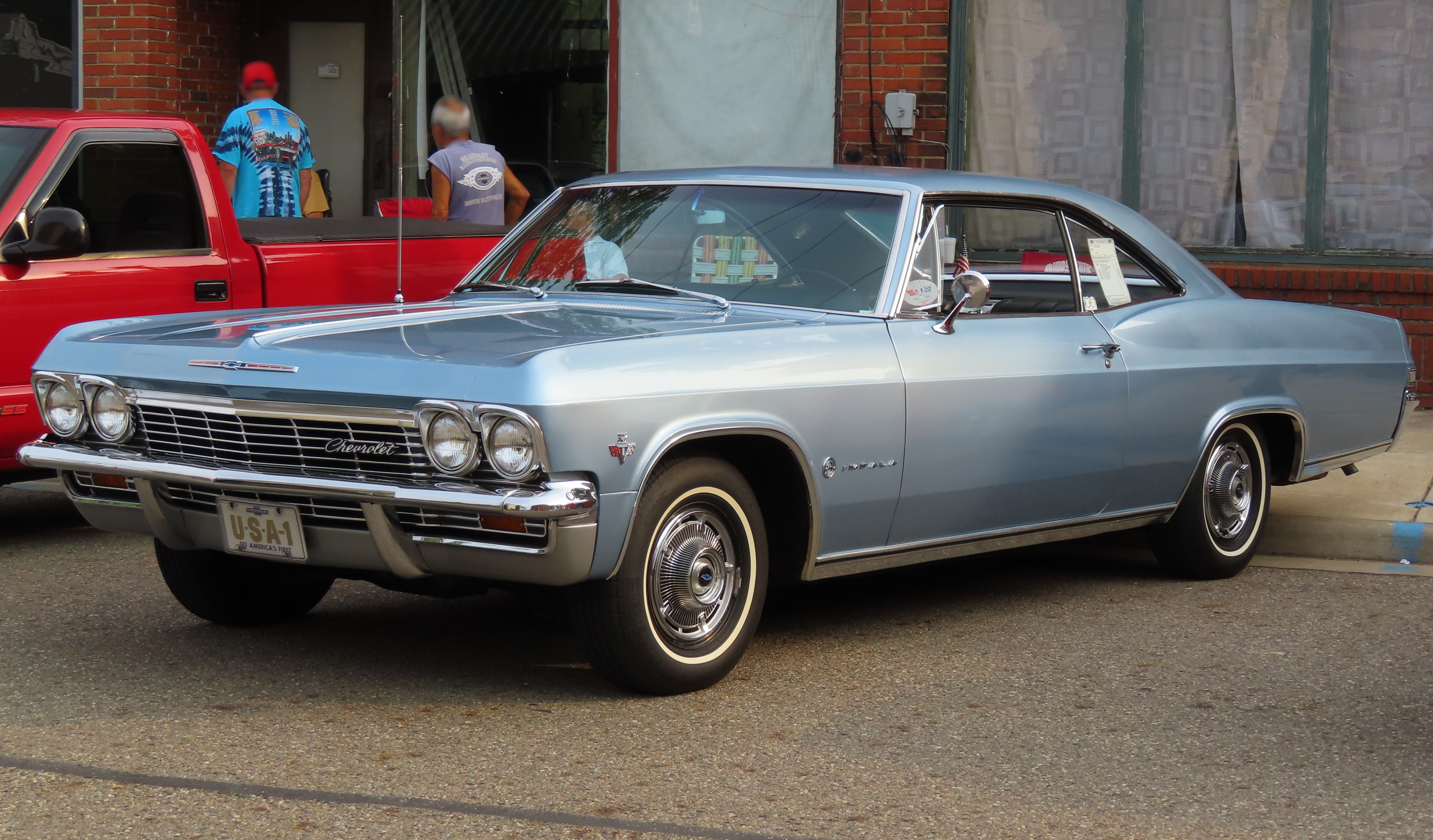
- 1965 Chevrolet Impala Sport Coupe

Overview
- Manufacturer: Chevrolet (General Motors)
- Production: 1964–1970
- Model years: 1965–1970
- Assembly: United States: (main plant); Flint, Michigan (Flint Assembly); (branch assembly); Arlington, Texas (Arlington Assembly); Atlanta, Georgia (Lakewood Assembly); Doraville, Georgia (Doraville Assembly); Framingham, Massachusetts (Framingham Assembly); Janesville, Wisconsin (Janesville Assembly); Lordstown, Ohio (Lordstown Assembly); Norwood, Ohio (Norwood Assembly); St. Louis Missouri (St. Louis Assembly); South Gate, California (South Gate Assembly); North Tarrytown, New York (North Tarrytown Assembly); Van Nuys, California (Van Nuys Assembly); Wilmington, Delaware (Wilmington Assembly); Canada: Oshawa, Ontario (Oshawa Car Assembly); Sainte-Thérèse, Quebec (Sainte-Thérèse Assembly); Australia
- Designer: Irv Rybicki (1963)

Body and chassis
- Body style: 2-door convertible 2-door hardtop (Custom Coupe); 2-door hardtop (Sport Coupe); 4-door hardtop (Sport Sedan); 4-door sedan 4-door station wagon (1965–68: Impala, 1969–70: Kingswood)
- Layout: FR layout
- Platform: B-body
- Related: Chevrolet Caprice; Chevrolet Bel Air; Chevrolet Biscayne; Chevrolet Kingswood; Chevrolet Townsman; Chevrolet Brookwood

Powertrain
- Engine: 250 cu in (4.1 L): Turbo Thrift I6; 283 cu in (4.6 L) Turbo Fire V8; 307 cu in (5.0 L) Turbo Fire V8; 327 cu in (5.4 L) Turbo Fire V8; 350 cu in (5.7 L) Turbo Fire V8; 396 cu in (6.5 L) Turbo-Jet V8; 400 cu in (6.6 L) Turbo Fire V8; 409 cu in (6.7 L) Turbo-Jet V8; 427 cu in (7.0 L) Turbo-Jet V8; 454 cu in (7.4 L) Turbo-Jet V8
- Transmission: 2-speed automatic; 3-speed automatic; 3-speed manual; 3-speed manual (three-on-the-tree); 4-speed manual

Dimensions
- Wheelbase: 119 in (3,023 mm)
- Length: 213.2 in (5,415 mm) (sedan/coupe); 212.4 in (5,395 mm) (wagon)
- Width: 79.9 in (2,029 mm)
- Height: 54.4–56.7 in (1,382–1,440 mm)

Chronology
- Predecessor: Chevrolet Impala (third generation)
- Successor: Chevrolet Impala (fifth generation)

The fourth-generation Chevrolet Impala is a full-size automobile produced by Chevrolet for the 1965 to 1970 model years. The 1965 Impala was all new, while the 1967 and 1969 models featured new bodies on the same redesigned perimeter frame introduced on the 1965 models. All Impalas of this generation received annual facelifts as well, distinguishing each model year. Throughout the early 1960s, Chevrolet's basic body designs became increasingly subtle, while the bright trim that was part of the Impala package added more than a touch of luxury to the look. The same pattern was followed in the interiors, where the best materials and equipment Chevrolet had to offer were displayed. In short, the Impala was on its way to becoming a kind of junior-grade Cadillac, which, for both the company and its customers, was just fine.

== History ==
=== 1965 ===
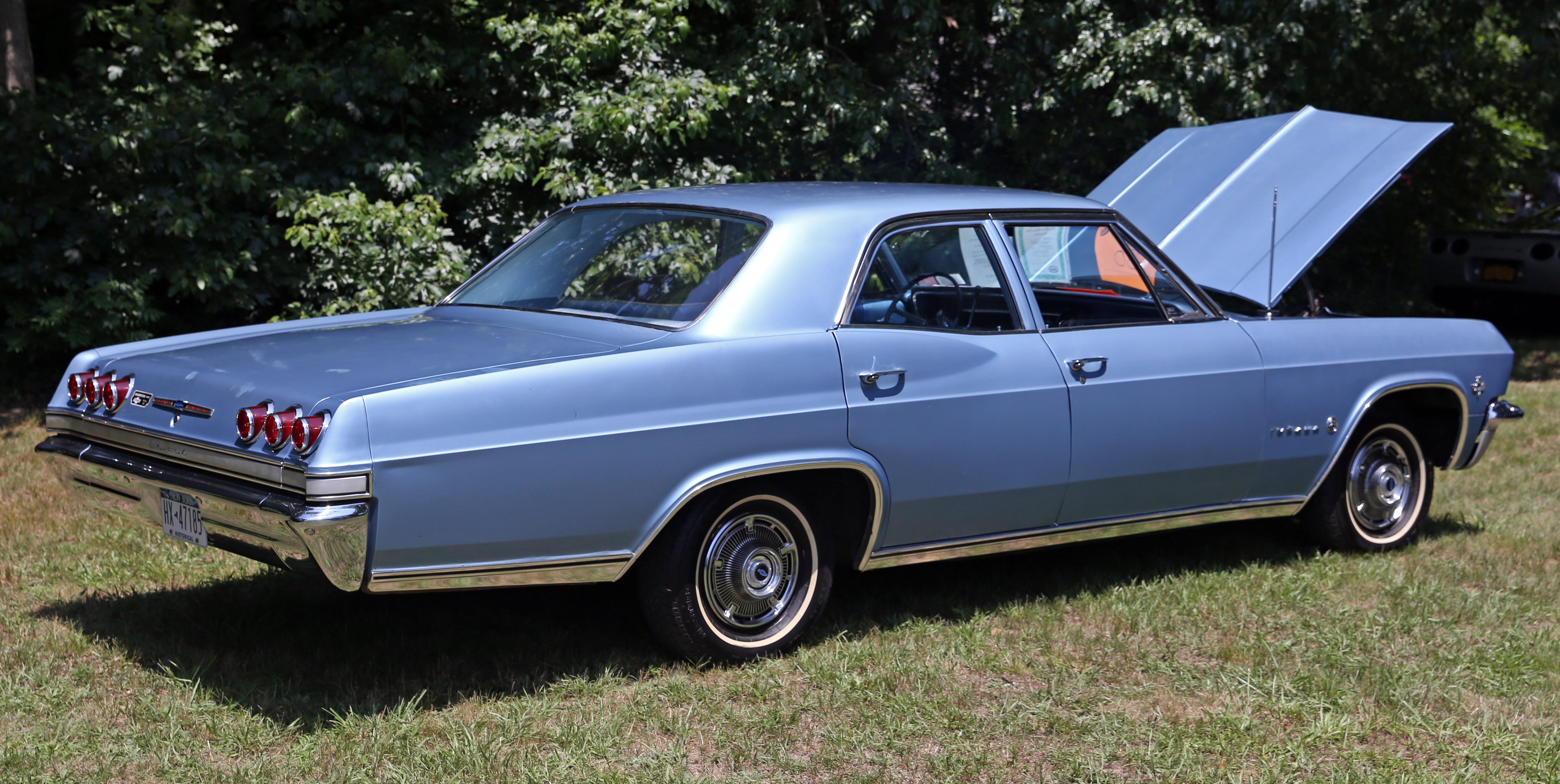
1965 Impala four-door sedan

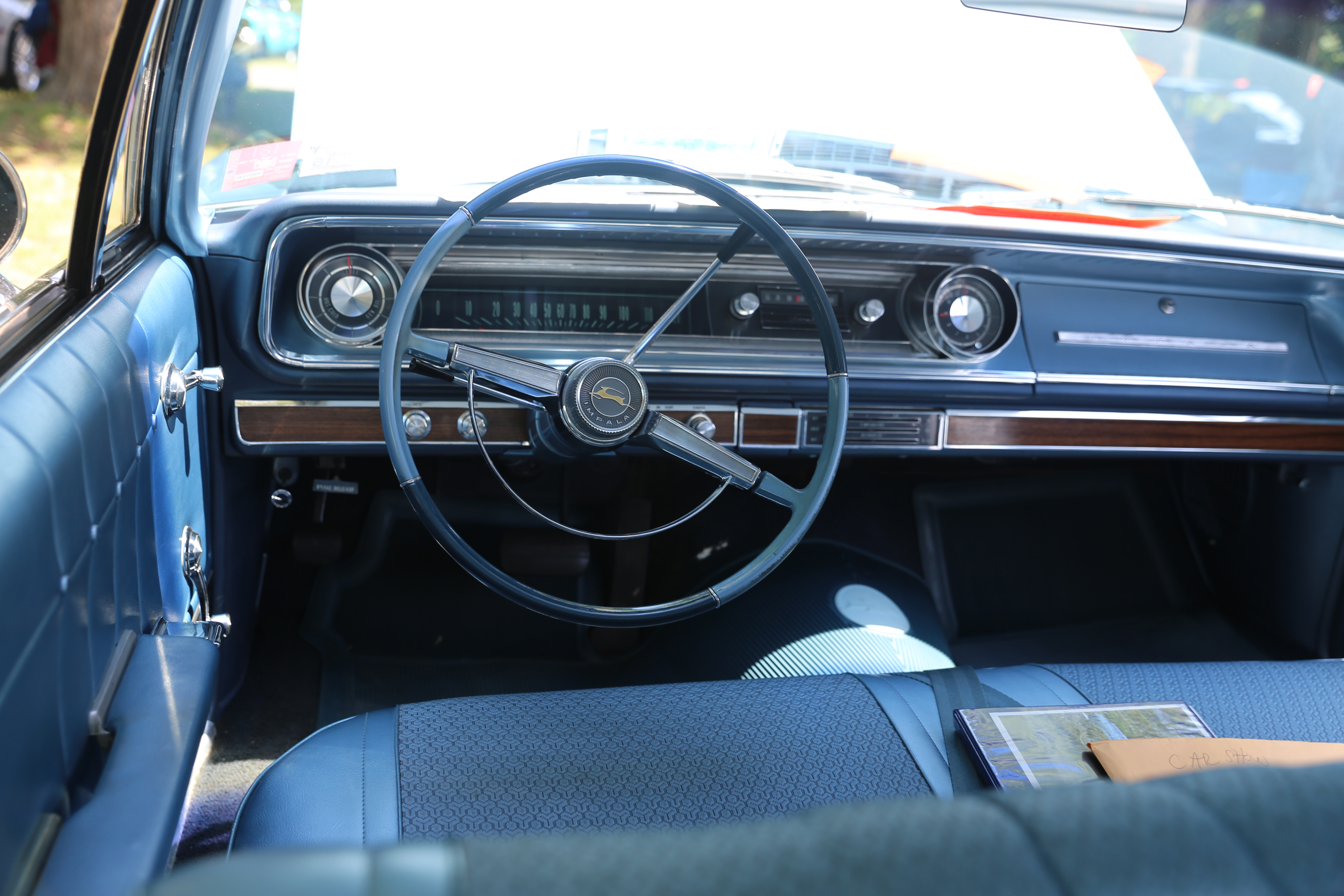
Interior of a 1965 Impala sedan

Totally redesigned in 1965, the Impala set an all-time industry annual sales record of more than 1 million units in the United States; which has never been bettered. The new full-size Chevrolet featured dramatically rounded sides, and an all-new front end with new hood contours, curved, frameless side glass (for pillarless models), and sharper angled windshield with newly reshaped vent windows. Sport Coupes wore a sleek semi-fastback roofline, and wheel well moldings were revised. Chevrolet promoted the cars' Wide-Stance design, adhesively bonded windshield, and improved full-coil suspension. A two-tone instrument panel put gauges in a recessed area ahead of the driver. The "X" frame was dropped for a new Girder-Guard full-width perimeter frame which reduced the size of the inside driveline tunnel and redesigned suspension. Two-speed Powerglide, as well as Synchro-Mesh 3- and 4-speed manual transmissions were available. The Turbo Hydra-Matic automatic transmission was offered for the first time. As with previous years, Impalas featured more chrome trim inside and out, with pleated tufted upholstery and door panels plus simulated walnut trim on the lower instrument panel.

Engine choices included the inline six-cylinder as well as the famous Chevrolet small-block and big-block V8s. Automatic transmission buyers were given the option of the newly introduced three-speed Turbo Hydra-Matic for the newly introduced Mark IV big-block engine, displacing 396 cubic inches. The old 409-cubic-inch (6.7 L) "W" engine was discontinued early in the 1965 model year, so early-production '65s got the 409, available only in four-barrel 340 and 400 horsepower options. The new 396 Turbo Jet V8 was the first General Motors engine to receive the Rochester Quadra-Jet four-barrel carburetor that would become a mainstay until the early 1980s. The new 396 was available as a 325-horsepower version with 10.25 to 1 compression ratio and hydraulic lifters or a high-performance version with 11 to 1 compression ratio, solid lifters and 425 horsepower.

For $200, an Impala four-door Sport Sedan could be transformed into an Impala Caprice establishing a name destined for decades of life. Referenced as Regular Production Option Z18, the Caprice option group included a black-out grille, vinyl top with Fleur de lis emblems, unique wheel covers, and narrow sill moldings. The new interiors were the most luxurious ever seen in a Chevrolet, and an array of comfort/convenience features. Specially stitched cloth door panels were accented with simulated walnut, and contour-padded seats wore a combination of fabric and vinyl. All of this aimed to give Chevrolet buyers a "one-of-a-kind" taste of Cadillac's look and ride. Its sales success prompted Chevrolet to make the V8-only Caprice a full series for 1966.

=== 1966 ===
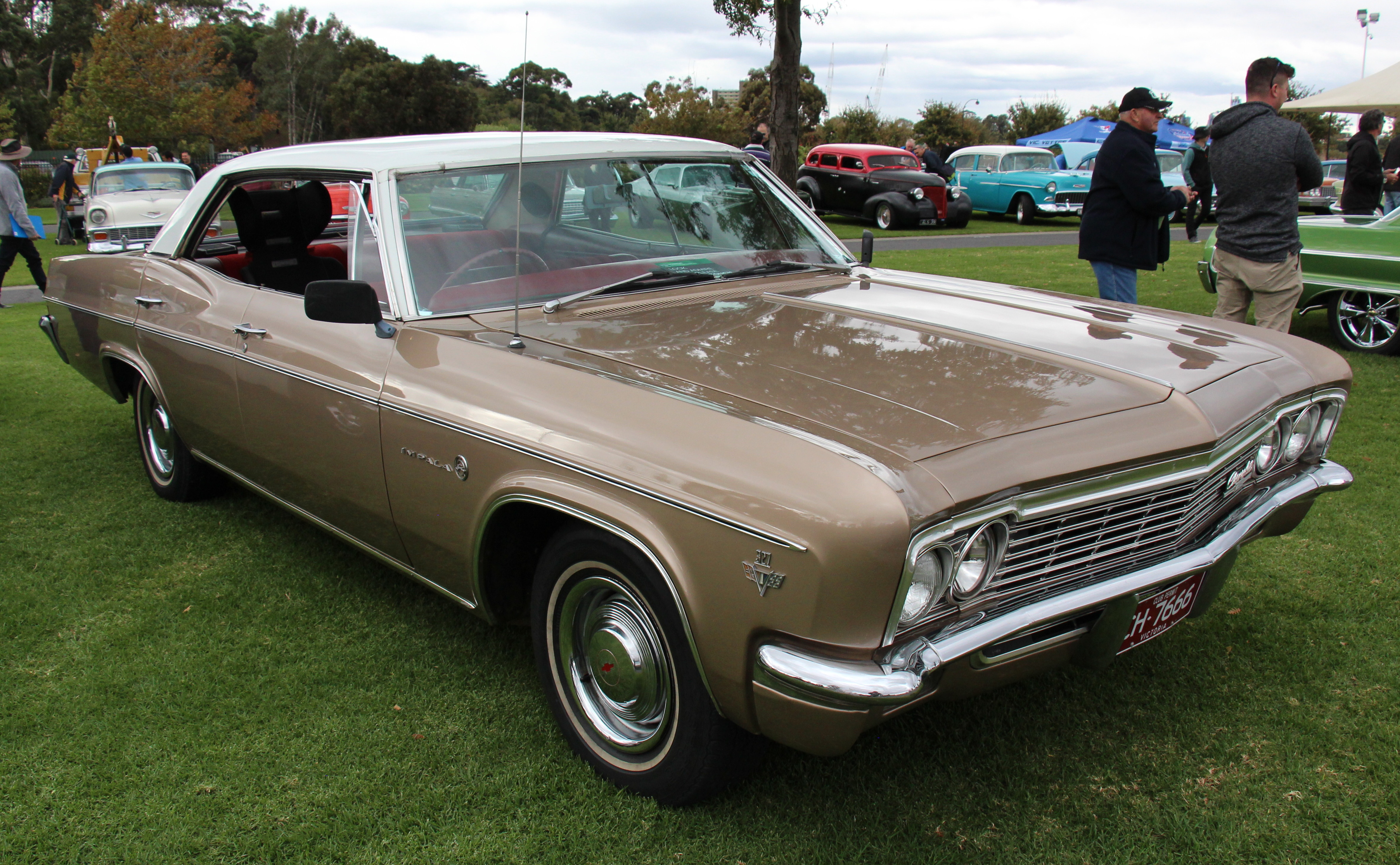
1966 Impala Sport Sedan

The 1966 Impala received only a minor facelift from its predecessor that included a revised horizontal bar grille up front and new triple rectangular taillights that replaced the triple round lights used on full-sized Chevrolets each year since 1958 with the exception of 1959, and chrome beltline strips were added in response to complaints about parking lot door dings on the clean-lined '65 models. The standard column-shift three-speed manual was now full synchronized, and a new 250-cubic-inch six-cylinder engine replaced the previous 230-cubic-inch six while the 195-horsepower 283-cubic-inch Turbo Fire V-8 remained the base V-8 engine. Optional engines included a 275-horsepower 327-cubic-inch Turbo Fire V-8, the 396-cubic-inch Turbo-Jet V-8 rated at 325 horsepower, or two new 427-cubic-inch Turbo Jet V8s of 390 horsepower with 10.5 to 1 compression ratio and hydraulic lifters or the high performance version rated at 425 horsepower with 11 to 1 compression ratio and solid lifters. A four-speed manual transmission was offered with all V8 engines. The two-speed Powerglide was exclusively offered with the six-cylinder engine as well as the 283 and 327-cubic-inch Turbo Fire V8s. The three-speed Turbo Hydramatic was limited to the 396 and 390-horsepower version of the 427 V-8. The Impala was the #2-selling convertible in the U.S. in 1966, with 38,000 sold.

=== 1967 ===
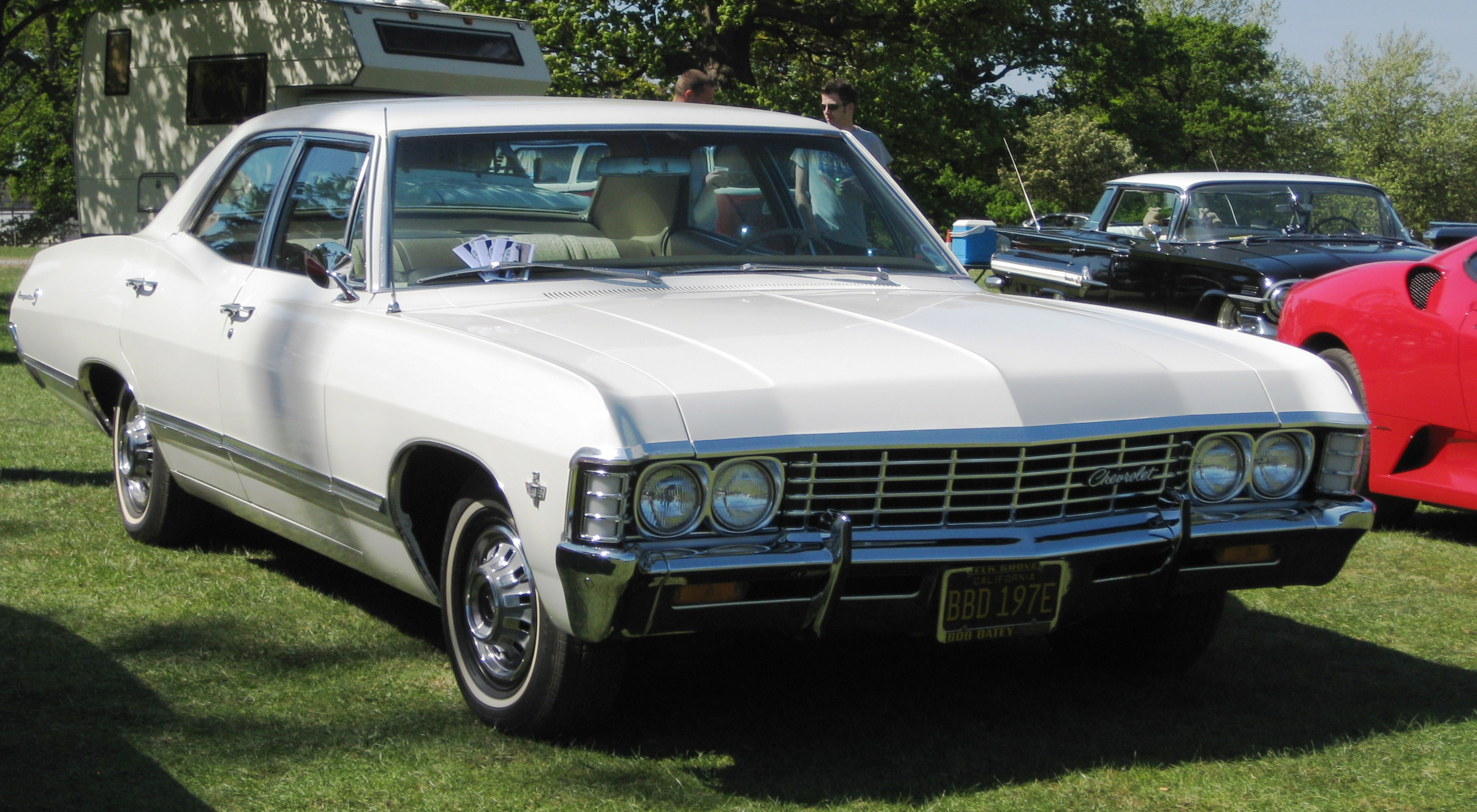
1967 Impala 4-Door Sedan

The 1967 Chevrolet full-size was redesigned with enhanced Coke bottle styling. Dimensions remained roughly the same, still on a 119-inch wheelbase, four inches longer than the mid-size Chevrolet Chevelle. Impala Sport Coupes had a graceful fastback roof line, which flowed in an unbroken line into the rear deck. In keeping with federal regulations, safety features were built into Impalas during the 1967 and 1968 model years, including a fully collapsible energy-absorbing steering column, side marker lights, and shoulder belts for closed models.

Most engine offerings were carryover from 1966 including the base 250 cubic-inch Turbo Thrift 6 (155 horsepower) and 283 cubic-inch Turbo Fire V-8 (195 horsepower), and optional 275-horsepower 327 cubic-inch Turbo Fire V-8 and 325-horsepower 396 cubic-inch Turbo Jet V-8, with a 385-horsepower 427 cubic-inch Turbo Jet V-8 now the top offering as the high-performance 425-horsepower version of the 427 offered in 1966 was not listed in the 1967 specifications. The two-speed Powerglide automatic was the only shiftless transmission offered with the 250 6 and 283 V-8, but the three-speed Turbo Hydramatic was now available with the 327 V-8 along with the big-block 396 and 427 V-8s.

New options for 1967 included front-disc brakes (standard with the SS-427 option), stereo 8-track player, fiber optic light monitoring system and vacuum power door locks.

Cloth-and-vinyl upholstery was standard in most closed body styles, but all-vinyl upholstery was a new option at extra-cost in several colors on all sedan and coupe body styles (heretofore all-vinyl trim was offered as an option on the Sport Coupe and Sport Sedan hardtop body styles in "black" only since 1963), and remained standard equipment on convertible and station wagon models, again in several colors. All Impala models for 1967 also featured upgraded door panels with carpeting on the lower section.

A black four-door version of this vehicle, nicknamed "Baby," is featured in the CW television show Supernatural.

=== 1968 ===
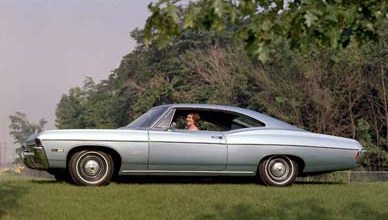
1968 Impala Sport Coupe

The 1968 model's front end received a facelift similar to the 1965 model, while rear bumpers held triple "horseshoe" shaped taillights. The formal Custom Coupe, previously a Caprice exclusive, became available as an Impala. Most Chevrolets got hidden windshield wipers. Plush new interiors also helped attract buyers. Impala overwhelmed the sales charts, as it had for years. Full-sized cars could have a 250-cubic-inch six, a 307-cubic-inch V-8, either of a pair of 327s of 250 or 275 horsepower, or a 325-horsepower 396-cubic-inch V-8. Topping the list was the big 427, rated at 385 or 425 horsepower. The two-speed Powerglide automatic transmission was still available with the 250 six-cylinder and 307 or 327 V-8s, but the three-speed Turbo Hydramatic could be ordered with all V-8 engines on the Impala Sport Sedan and Custom coupe. "Astro Ventilation" was an option for the Custom Coupe that included fresh-air vents, the same units that were used for the optional air conditioning, sans the center upper vent. Cars equipped with this option got full-length door glass minus the vent windows.

=== 1969 ===
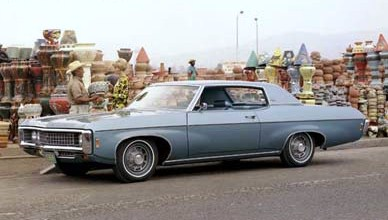
1969 Impala Custom Coupe

The 1969 Impala and other full-sized Chevrolets were restyled with crisper body lines and front bumpers that wrapped around the grille and ventless front windows were new on all models. The 119-inch (3,023 mm) wheelbase, inner body shell and framework were carried over from the 1965 model – along with the roof lines of pillared four-door sedans and station wagons. The station wagon was renamed the Kingswood - reverting to a pre-1962 Chevrolet practice of using different nameplates on wagons than other models. Inside, front seat headrests were now standard equipment due to a federal safety mandate and the ignition switch moved from the dashboard to the steering column and doubled as a lock for the steering wheel when the key was removed, a Federal mandate that took effect with the 1970 models but introduced a year earlier on all General Motors cars. The instrument panel was restyled and highlighted by a new steering wheel.

The 1969 Impala also offered a new GM-designed variable-ratio power steering unit as optional equipment along with a seldom-ordered "Liquid Tire Chain" option, which was a vacuum activated button that would spray ice melt on the rear tires (UPC option code is "V75"). The standard engine was enlarged to a 235 hp (175 kW) 327 cubic-inch V8 with optional engine choices including a new 350 cubic-inch Turbo Fire V8 rated at 255 and 300 hp (220 kW), a 265 hp (198 kW) 396 cubic-inch Turbo Jet V8, and 427 cubic-inch Turbo Jet V8s rated at 335 and 390 hp (291 kW). The L72 425 horse power engine was available in all B-Bodies. All V8 engines were now available with the three-speed Turbo Hydramatic transmission for the first time though the two-speed Powerglide was still offered with the 327 and 350 V8s. During the 1969 model year Impala production, including Kingswood wagons totaled 777,000 units, compared to 166,000 Caprices and Kingswood Estate wagons, 68,700 Biscaynes and Brookwood wagons, and 155,700 Bel Airs and Townsman wagons. Impala totals for 1969 included 768,000 produced with V-8 engines and 8,700 with six-cylinders.

=== 1970 ===
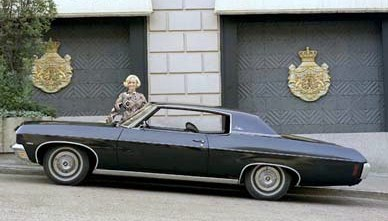
1970 Impala Custom Coupe

The 1970 Impala got a minor facelift featuring a more conventional bumper under the grille replacing the wrap-around unit used in 1969 and new triple vertical taillights. Fiberglass-belted tires on 15-inch (380 mm) wheels were made standard equipment along with a larger standard 250 hp (186 kW) 350 cubic-inch Turbo Fire V8, on most models (the 250 cubic-inch six-cylinder engine was now only offered on the 1970 Impala four-door sedan as well that year's lower-line Biscayne and Bel Air four-door sedans). Optional V8s included a 300 hp (220 kW) 350 and a new 265 hp (198 kW) 400 cubic-inch Turbo Fire V8 (not to be confused with Chevrolet's Turbo Jet big-block 402 V8 (essentially a bored out 396) offered on that year's Chevelles and Monte Carlos). At the top of the engine roster, the big block 427 was replaced by a new, longer stroke, 454 cubic-inch Turbo Jet V8 offered in power ratings of 345 hp (257 kW) and 390 hp (290 kW). The 155-horsepower Turbo Thrift six-cylinder, and 250- and 265 hp (198 kW) Turbo Fire engines were designed to use regular gasoline while the 300 hp (220 kW) 350 Turbo Fire and both 454 Turbo Jet engines required premium fuel. A three-speed manual transmission with column shift was standard equipment as in previous years but the floor-mounted four-speed manual with Hurst shifter was dropped from the option list for 1970 as were the Strato bucket seats and center console previously offered on coupes. Automatic transmission options included the two-speed Powerglide on 250 6s and 350 V8s, and three-speed Turbo Hydramatic was available with all engines. Power front disc brakes were standard on the Impala Custom coupe and optional on all other models. The 1970 Impala was one of three remaining Chevrolet convertibles, with only 9,562 were built. Interest in all size rag tops had dwindled. So was the fascination with large sporty cars, prompting abandonment of the Impala Super Sport. Output of full-sized Chevrolets dropped sharply for the 1970 calendar year, below the million mark, partly as a result of a 65-day strike in the fall of 1970 - but that strike affected the production of early 1971 models. Impala sales, as expected, ranked far above other big Chevrolets with 612,800 Impalas built (6,500 six-cylinder and 606,300 V-8s) compared to 92,000 Caprices, 75,800 Bel Airs and 35,400 Biscaynes, plus another 162,000 station wagons for all series.

Right Hand Drive cars were manufactured in Canada for export to some countries such as Australia, UK, etc., until 1969. They used a version of the 1965 Impala dash panel until 1969. Australian models were assembled in Australia from kits as this lessened tax on the cars. A similar arrangement applied in New Zealand although the bodies were supplied from Canada already welded, painted and trimmed.

== Impala SS ==
1965 Super Sport exteriors differed only slightly from regular Impalas. Rocker panel trim was deleted. "Super Sport" scripts replaced the "Impala" fender badges. The new center console housed a rally-type electric clock, and full instrumentation now included a vacuum gauge. A total of 243,114 Impala SS coupes and convertibles were built for 1965.

The 1966 Impala SS was facelifted with a revised grille and new rectangular taillights that replaced the triple round units. A chrome beltline strip shared with regular Impalas was added in response to complaints about door dings on the clean-lined 1965s. Inside were new "Strato-bucket" front seats with thinner and higher seat backs, and a center console with an optional gauge package available. Sales of the 1966 Impala SS dropped by more than 50% to around 117,000 units; this was mainly due to the sport/performance car market switching from full-sized models to intermediates (including Chevrolet's own Chevelle SS396 and Pontiac GTO), along with the emerging market for the even smaller pony car market created by the Ford Mustang in 1964 that Chevrolet would respond to with the Camaro for 1967.

The 1967 Impala SS was less decorated than other Impalas; Super Sports had black grille accents and black-accented body-side and rear fender moldings. Lesser models leaned more toward brightwork inside and out. Buyers could choose either vinyl bucket seats with a center console, or a Strato-Bench seat with a fold-down center armrest. Standard wheel covers were the same as the optional full covers on other big Chevrolets, but the centers featured the "SS" logo surrounded by tri-color ring of red, white and blue. "Chevrolet" and "Impala" callouts on the body were all replaced by "Impala SS" badges. Of the 76,055 Impala SS models built, just 2,124 were ordered with RPO Z24, a special performance package that included RPO F41 heavy-duty suspension and other performance features, RPO L36 (385 hp (287 kW; 390 PS)) Turbo-Jet 427 cu in (7.0 L) V8, as well as a special trim package that replaced the "Impala SS" badges with large "SS427" emblems on the front grille and rear trim. None of these cars had the name "Impala" anywhere on the body or interior, and Chevrolet often marketed them as the "Chevrolet SS427," sans the "Impala" name. The Z24 package also included a special hood with fake chrome-plated intake. Only about 400 Super Sports had a six-cylinder engine from 1967 to 1968, 390 hp (291 kW; 395 PS) in 1969, or L72 (425 hp (317 kW; 431 PS)) from 1968 to 1969. Special SS427 badging, inside and out, was the rule, but few were sold, since muscle car enthusiasts were seeking big-block intermediates, such as the Chevelle SS396 and Plymouth Road Runner.

In 1968 as Caprice sales escalated, those of the Impala Super Sport suffered a decline. Much of this drop in sales was no doubt due to the availability of big-block engines in the mid-sized (and lighter) Chevelle, and even Novas could be special-ordered with the 396 engine with the new-for-1968 body. No longer a separate series, the Super Sport was a mere $179 option package (Regular Production Option Z03) for the two Impala coupes and the convertible. Only 38,210 Impalas were so-equipped, including 1,778 with the Z24 package, which was carried over from 1967. In 1968 only, SS427s could be ordered without the Z03 SS package, which meant SS427 equipment but no bucket seats, SS door panels, or center console. The Z03 Impala SS could be identified by "Impala Super Sport" badges on the front grille, rear fenders and trunk lid. Z24-optioned cars included "SS427" emblems to replace the "Impala Super Sport" badges, a special layered "pancake" hood, and three "gills" mounted on the front fender aft of the wheel well à la Corvette Stingray.

In 1969, the Impala SS was available only as the Z24 (SS427), coming exclusively with a 427 cu in (7.0 L) V8 of 335 hp (250 kW; 340 PS), 390 hp (291 kW; 395 PS), or 425 hp (317 kW; 431 PS). This was the final year for the Impala SS until 1994. Unlike the previous two years, the 1969s finally got "Impala" script on the front fenders and interior. The 1969 Impala SS had no distinctive SS badging inside the car except for an "SS" logo the steering wheel (again, there was no Z03 offered that year). Like the 1968s, the Z24 could be ordered on the Impala convertible, Sport Coupe, or Custom Coupe. 1969 was the last year that the Impala SS was offered with the Z24 package, but the only year in which front disc brakes and 15-inch (380 mm) wheels were standard; that made the 1969 SS427 mechanically better than the previous versions in standard form. Although sales of 1969 Z24-optioned Impalas increased to approximately 2,455 units from the 1,778 Z03-optioned units of 1968, and high-powered big-block V8 engines continued to be available, there would be no Impala SS for 1970. The 427 was also replaced on the engine offerings list by a new Turbo-Jet 454 producing 390 hp (291 kW; 395 PS)

The 1965–1970 GM B platform is the fourth best selling automobile platform in history after the Volkswagen Beetle, Ford Model T and the Lada Riva.

== Gallery ==
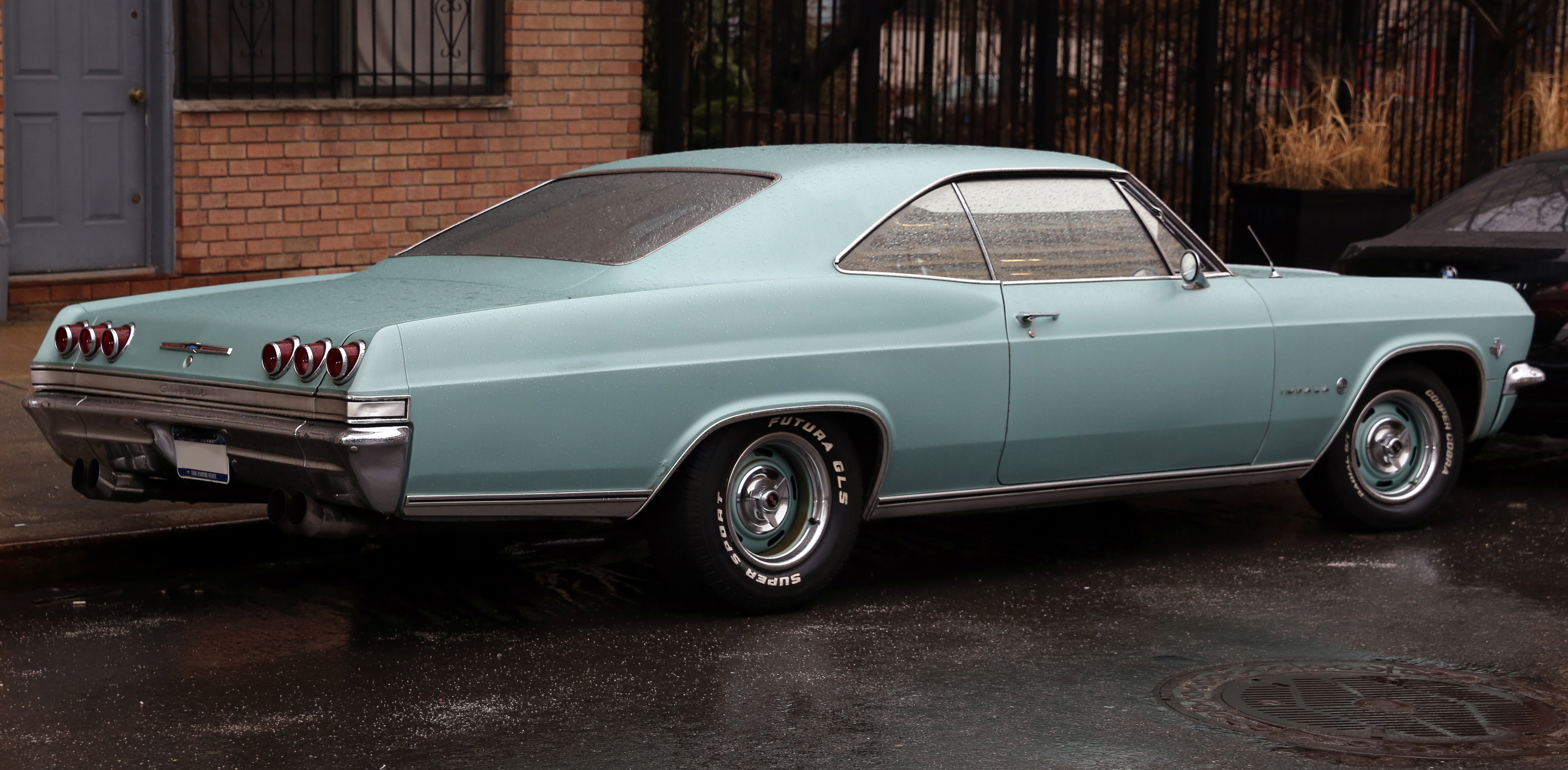
1965 Impala Sport Coupe

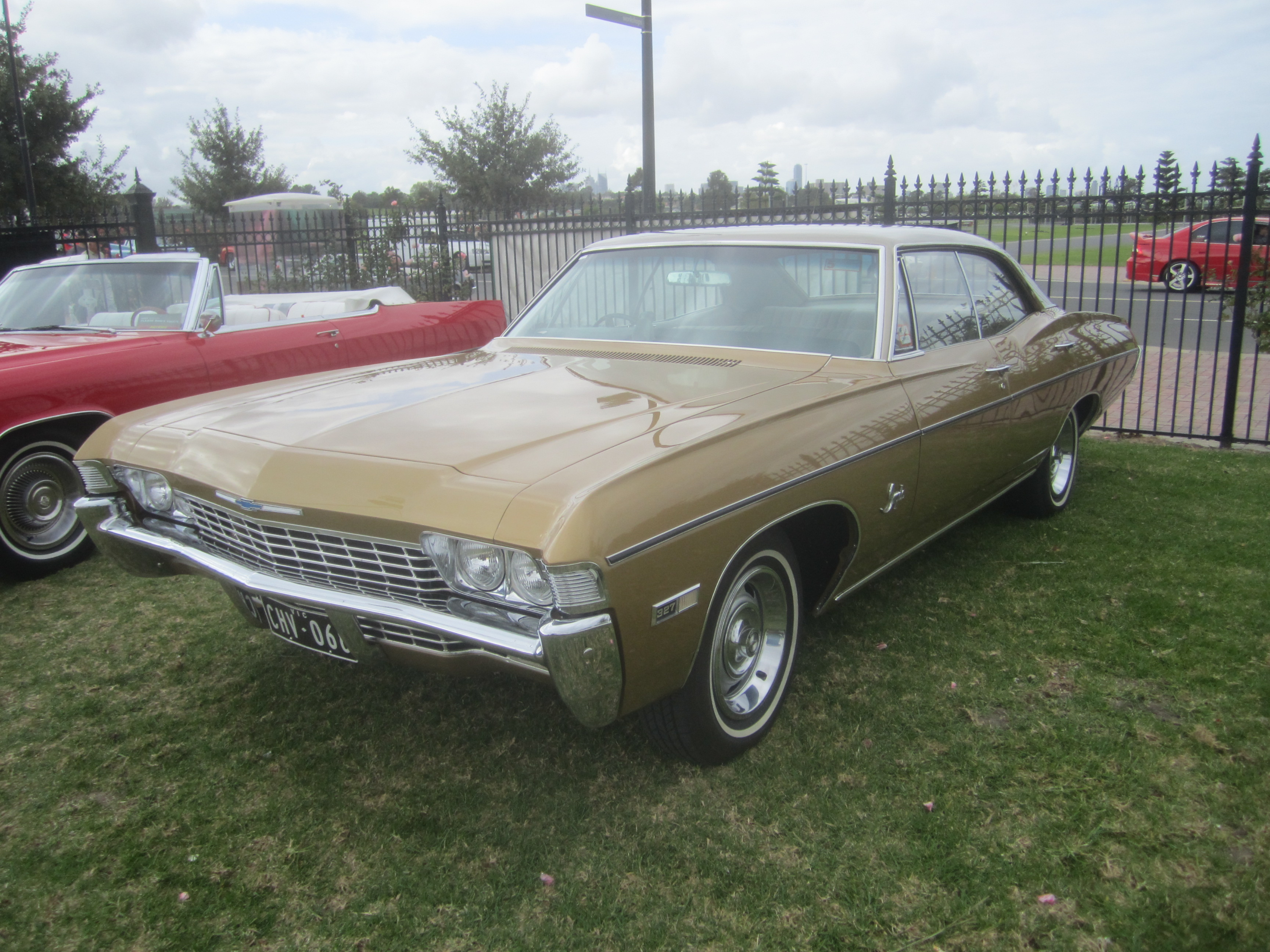
1968 Impala four-door Hardtop Sedan

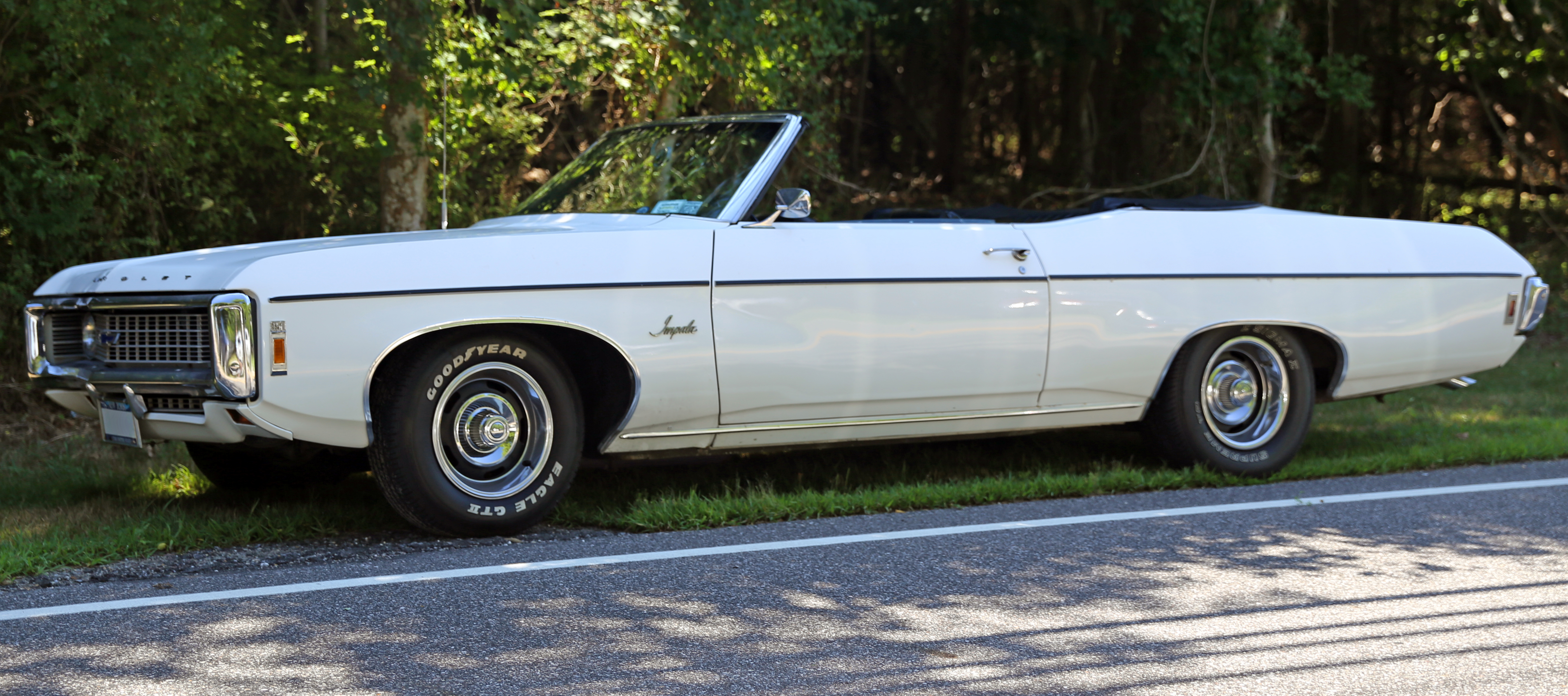
1969 Impala Convertible

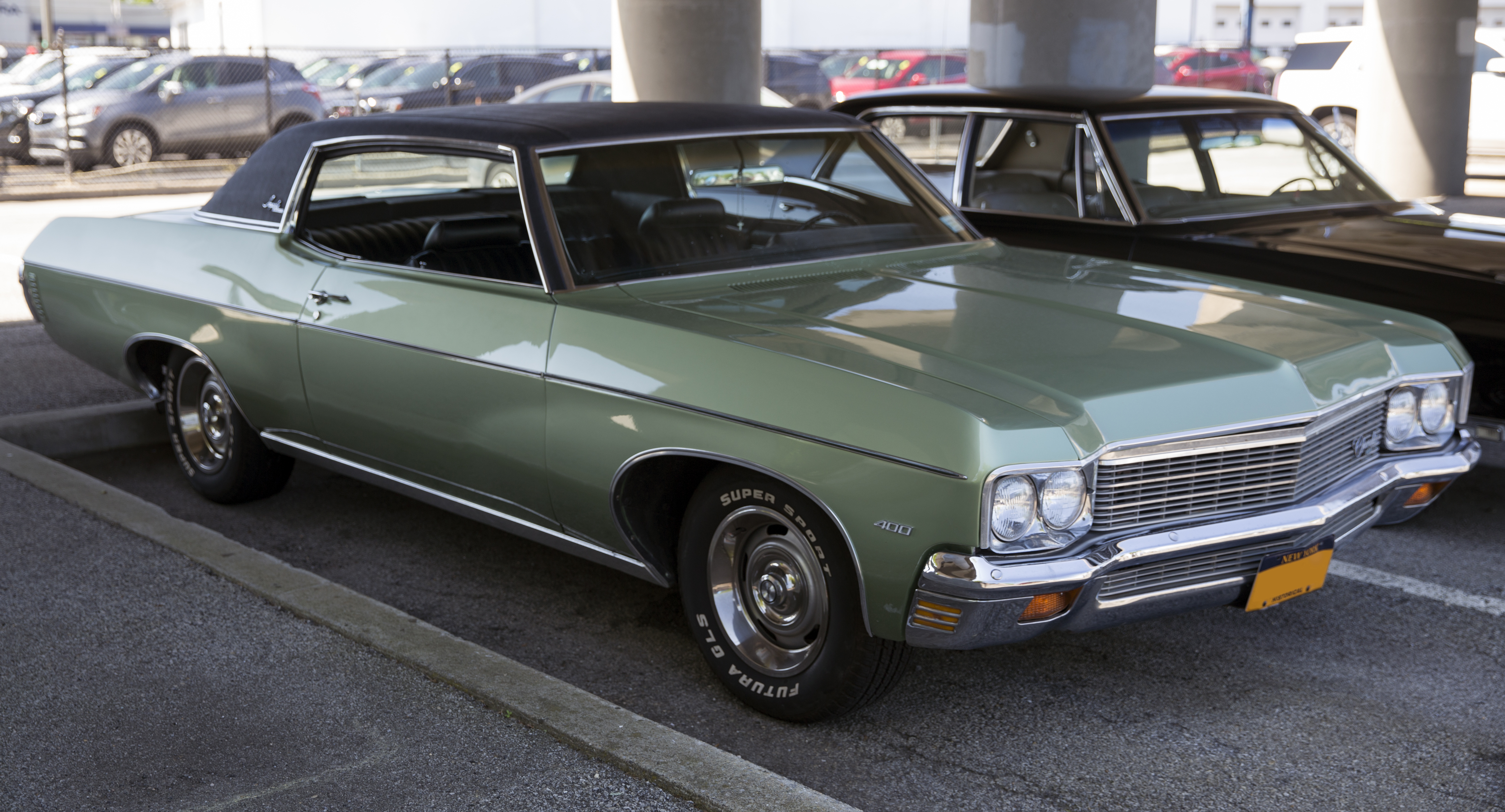
1970 Impala Custom Coupe
