= Jingle Bells =

1857 Christmas song written by James Lord Pierpont

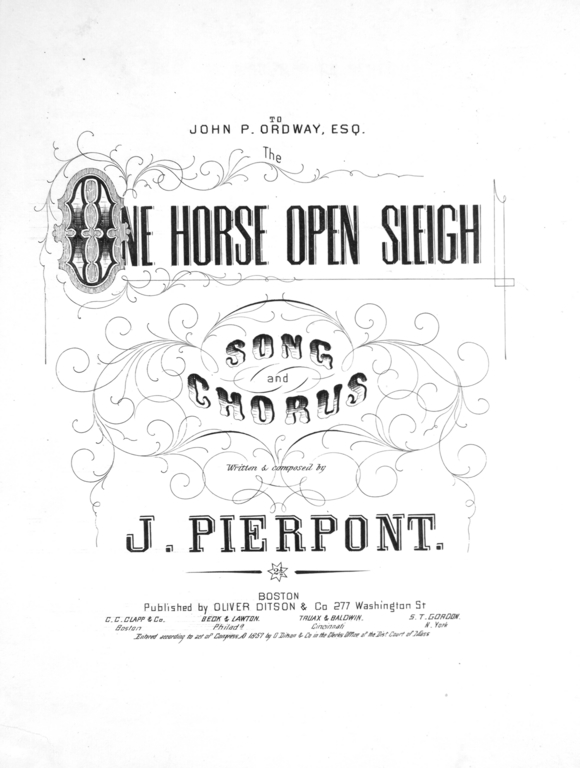
- Title page of "The One Horse Open Sleigh"

Song
- Language: English
- Published: September 16, 1857, by Oliver Ditson & Co., Boston, Massachusetts, U.S.
- Genre: Christmas
- Songwriter: James Lord Pierpont
- Originally titled as "The One Horse Open Sleigh"

"Jingle Bells" is an American song and one of the most commonly sung Christmas songs in the world. It was written by James Lord Pierpont. It is an unsettled question where and when Pierpont originally composed the song that would become known as "Jingle Bells". It was published under the title "The One Horse Open Sleigh" in September 1857. Although it has no original connection to Christmas, it became associated with winter and Christmas in the 1860s and 1870s, and it was featured in a variety of parlor song and college anthologies in the 1880s. It was first recorded in 1889 on an Edison cylinder; this recording, believed to be the first Christmas record, is lost, but an 1898 recording—also from Edison Records—survives.

== History ==
=== Composition ===
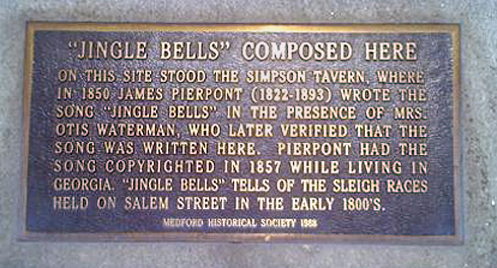
Plaque at 19 High Street, Medford, Massachusetts

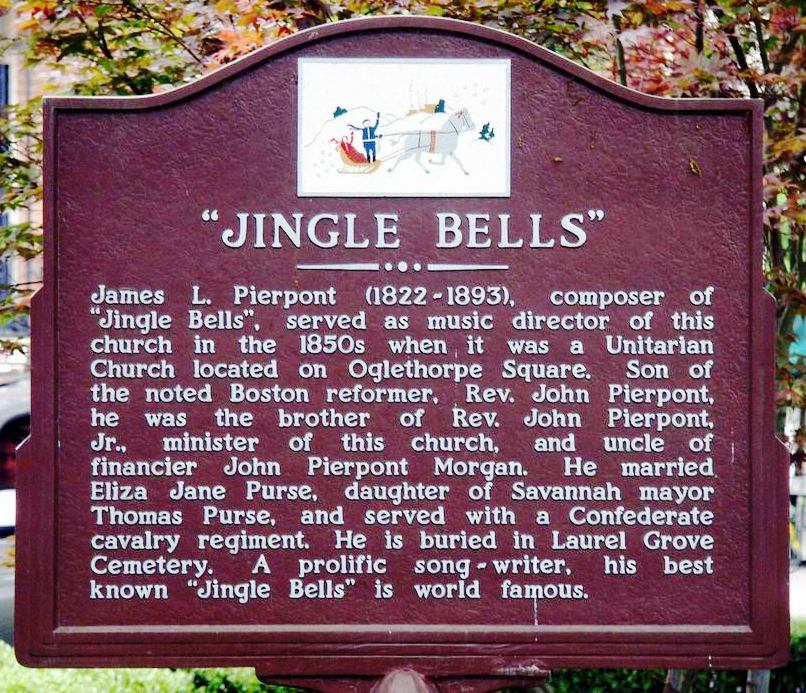
Historical marker in Savannah, Georgia

Musical notations of the original version

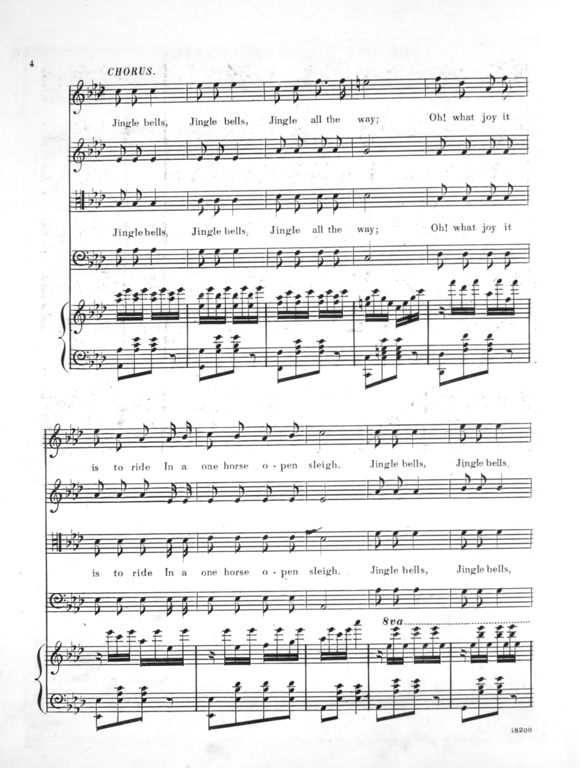
First half of the chorus

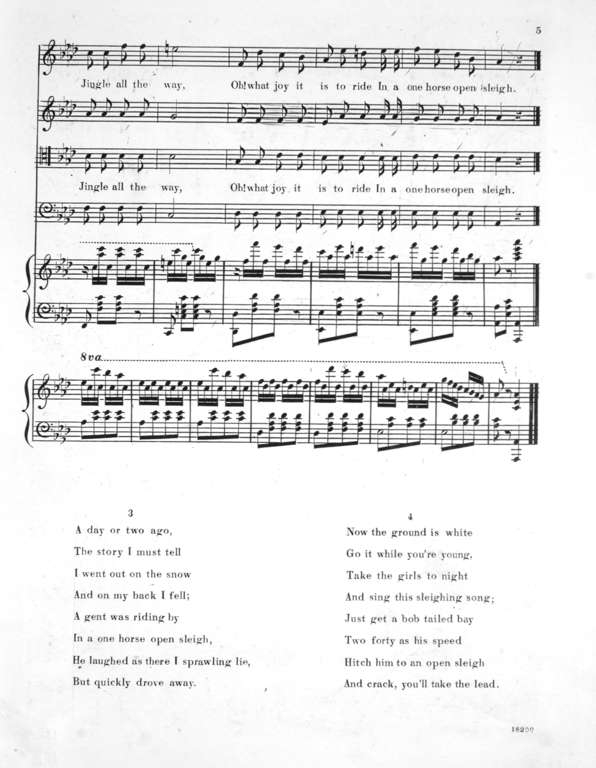
Second half of the chorus and other verses

James Lord Pierpont originally copyrighted the song with the name "The One Horse Open Sleigh" on September 16, 1857. The songwriting credit given was "Song and Chorus written and composed by J. Pierpont." Possibly intended as a drinking song, it did not become a Christmas song until decades after it was first performed. Pierpont dedicated the song to John P. Ordway, Esq., an organizer of a troupe called "Ordway's Aeolians".

It is not known where and when Pierpont originally composed the song that would become known as "Jingle Bells". A plaque at 19 High Street in the center of Medford Square in Medford, Massachusetts, commemorates the "birthplace" of "Jingle Bells", and claims that Pierpont wrote the song there in 1850, at what was then the Simpson Tavern. Previous local history narratives claim the song was inspired by the town's popular sleigh races during the 19th century. Researcher Kyna Hamil proposes that the song was composed in Boston, before Pierpont moved to Savannah in the fall of 1857.

The song was republished in 1859 by Oliver Ditson and Company, 277 Washington Street, Boston, with the new title "Jingle Bells; or, The One Horse Open Sleigh". Its sheet music cover featured a drawing of sleigh bells around the title which was draped in snow. Sleigh bells were strapped across the horse to make the jingle, jangle sound.

"Jingle Bells" was first performed on September 15, 1857, at Ordway Hall in Boston by blackface minstrel performer Johnny Pell. The song was in the then-popular style or genre of "sleighing songs". Pierpont's lyrics are strikingly similar to lines from many other popular sleigh-riding songs of the time; researcher Kyna Hamill argued that this, along with his constant need for money, led him to compose and release the song solely as a financial enterprise: "Everything about the song is churned out and copied from other people and lines from other songs—there's nothing original about it."

By the time the song was released and copyrighted, Pierpont had relocated to Savannah, Georgia, to serve as organist and music director of that city's Unitarian Church (now Unitarian Universalist), where his brother, Rev. John Pierpont Jr., served as minister. In August 1857, Pierpont married Eliza Jane Purse, daughter of the mayor of Savannah. Pierpont remained in Savannah and never returned north.

=== Recordings and performances ===
James Lord Pierpont's 1857 composition "Jingle Bells" became one of the most performed and most recognizable secular holiday songs ever written, not only in the United States, but around the world. In recognition of this achievement, James Lord Pierpont was voted into the Songwriters Hall of Fame.

"Jingle Bells" was first recorded by banjoist Will Lyle on October 30, 1889 (attested A T E Wangemann Logbook, p. 114), on an Edison cylinder, but no surviving copies are known to exist. The earliest surviving vocal recording was made by the Edison Male Quartette in 1898, also on an Edison cylinder (and 1898 Columbia brown wax 4090), as part of a 'Christmas' medley titled "Sleigh Ride Party". There is a version by the Hayden Quartet called Sleigh Ride Party recorded in 1901. In 1902, the Hayden Quartet recorded "Jingle Bells". The song became a Christmas favorite in the early twentieth century.

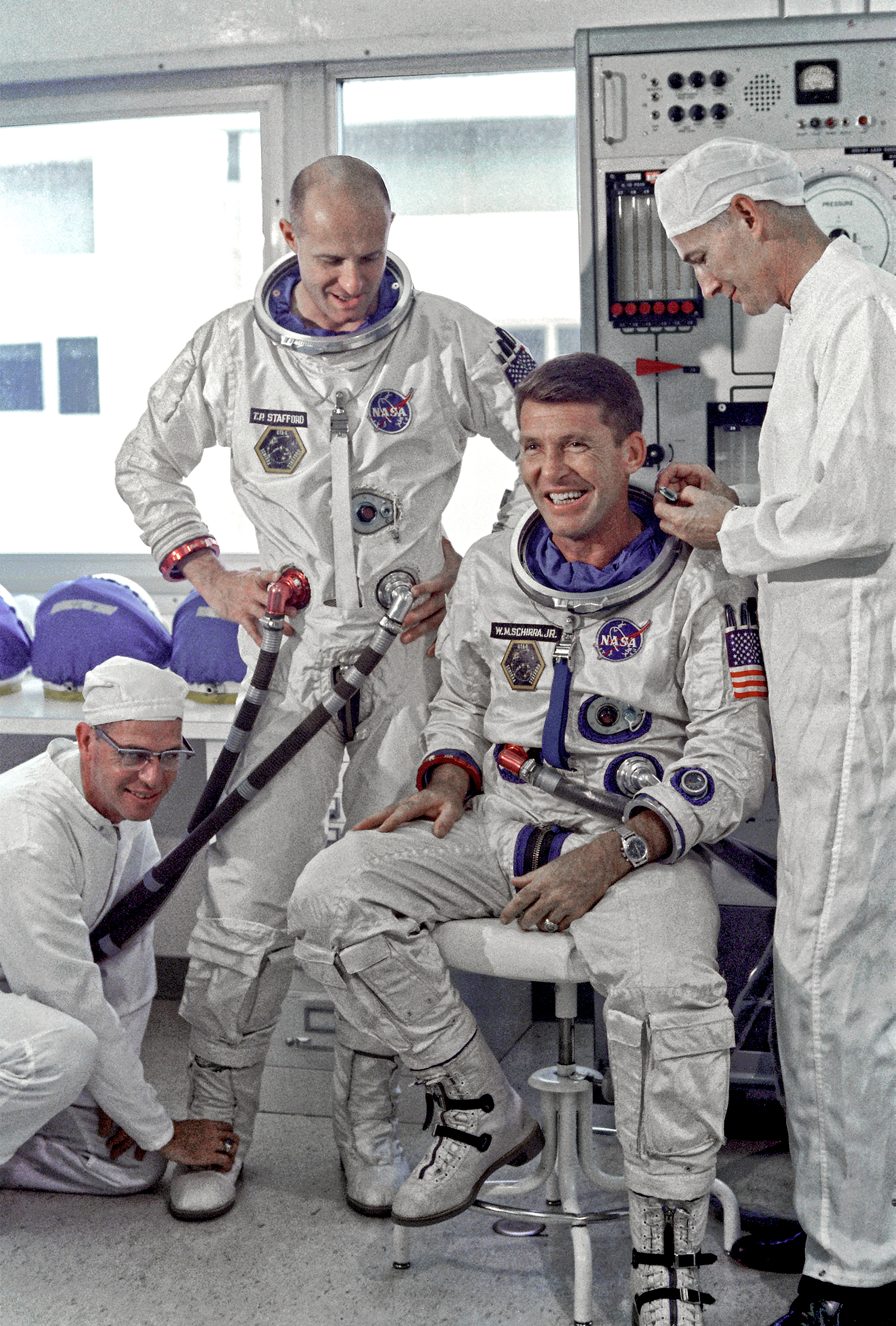
Wally Schirra and Tom Stafford of Gemini VI (1965)

In 1935, Benny Goodman and His Orchestra reached No. 18 on the charts with their Swing or big band recording of "Jingle Bells". In 1941, Glenn Miller and His Orchestra with Tex Beneke, Marion Hutton, Ernie Caceres, and the Modernaires on vocals had a No. 5 hit on the Billboard pop singles chart with a big band arrangement of "Jingle Bells" on RCA Victor as Bluebird 11353-A. In 1943, Bing Crosby and the Andrews Sisters recorded "Jingle Bells" as Decca 23281 which reached No. 19 on the charts and sold over a million copies. In 1951, Les Paul had a No. 10 hit with a multi-tracked version on guitar. In 2001, House of Mouse version, sung by Wayne Allwine, Russi Taylor, and Bill Farmer. In 2006, Kimberley Locke had a No. 1 hit on the Billboard Adult Contemporary chart with a recording of the song.

=== First song in space ===
"Jingle Bells" was one of the first songs to be broadcast from space, in a Christmas-themed prank by Gemini 6 astronauts Tom Stafford and Wally Schirra. While in space on December 16, 1965, they sent this report to Mission Control:

C6: Gemini VII, this is Gemini VI. We have an object, looks like a satellite going from north to south, probably in a polar orbit. He's in a very low trajectory traveling from north to south and has a very high climbing ratio. It looks like it might even be a ... Very low. Looks like he might be going to reenter soon. Stand by one ... You might just let me try to pick up that thing. (Music – Jingle Bells – from Spacecraft VI) P7: We got the tune, VI. C6: That was live, VII, not tape. CC: You're too much, VI.

The astronauts then produced a smuggled harmonica and sleigh bells, and with Schirra on the harmonica and Stafford on the bells, broadcast a rendition of "Jingle Bells". The harmonica, shown to the press upon their return, was a Hohner "Little Lady", a tiny harmonica approximately one inch (2.5 cm) long, by 3/8 of an inch (0.95 cm) wide. Schirra donated the harmonica to the Smithsonian in 1967.

Radio transmission
Between Gemini VI, Gemini VII and Mission Control in Houston, December 16, 1965

== Lyrics ==
Music historian James Fuld notes that (as opposed to an adjective), "the word jingle in the title and opening phrase is apparently an imperative verb"; however, "jingle bells" is commonly interpreted to refer to a certain kind of bell. In the winter in New England in pre-automobile days, it was common to adorn horses' harnesses with straps bearing bells as a way to avoid collisions at blind intersections, since a horse-drawn sleigh in snow produces almost no audible noise. The rhythm of the tune apparently mimics that of a trotting horse's bells.

Jingle Bells

Dashing through the snow
In a one-horse open sleigh
O'er the fields we go
Laughing all the way
Bells on bob tail ring
Making spirits bright
What fun it is to ride and sing
A sleighing song tonight!

Oh! Jingle bells, jingle bells,
Jingle all the way.
Oh! what fun it is to ride
In a one-horse open sleigh. Hey!
Jingle bells, jingle bells,
Jingle all the way;
Oh! what fun it is to ride
In a one-horse open sleigh.

A day or two ago
I thought I'd take a ride
And soon, Miss Fanny Bright
Was seated by my side,
The horse was lean and lank
Misfortune seemed his lot
He got into a drifted bank
And then we got up sot. (Note: "Upsot" is an archaic or dialectic variant of the past tense of "upset", which allows the line to rhyme with "lot".)
|: chorus :|

A day or two ago,
The story I must tell
I went out on the snow,
And on my back I fell;
A gent was riding by
In a one-horse open sleigh,
He laughed as there I sprawling lie,
But quickly drove away. Ah!
|: chorus :|

Now the ground is white
Go it while you're young,
Take the girls tonight
and sing this sleighing song;
Just get a bobtailed bay
Two forty as his speed (Note: Two forty refers to a mile in two minutes and forty seconds at the trot, or 22.5 miles per hour (36.2 km/h). This is a good speed, and suggests the desired horse of that era was a type later known as a Standardbred.)
Hitch him to an open sleigh
And snap! You'll take the lead.
|: chorus :|

Notes to lyrics

=== Original lyrics ===
The two first stanzas and chorus of the original 1857 lyrics differed slightly from those known today. It is unknown who replaced the words with those of the modern version. Underlined lyrics are the removed lyrics from the original version. Bold lyrics are the new lyrics in the current version.

Dashing thro' the snow,
In a one-horse open sleigh,
O'er the hills (fields) we go,
Laughing all the way;
Bells on bob tail ring,
Making spirits bright,
Oh what sport (What fun it is) to ride and sing
A sleighing song tonight.

|: chorus :|
Jingle bells, jingle bells,
Jingle all the way;
Oh! what joy (fun) it is to ride
In a one-horse open sleigh.

A day or two ago
I tho't I'd take a ride
And soon Miss Fannie Bright
Was seated by my side.
The horse was mean and lank
Misfortune seemed his lot
He got into a drifted bank
And we— (then) we got upsot.

== Melody ==
Jingle Bells, or The One Horse Open Sleigh
Original melody on piano

Jingle Bells
Performed by Kevin MacLeod on piano, flute, clarinet, French horn

Jingle Bells
Performed on by Kevin MacLeod celesta and violin

Jingle Bells
Performed by Kevin MacLeod on piano, glockenspiel, celesta

The original 1857 version of "Jingle Bells" featured a substantially different chorus. The progression of descending chords in the original refrain (A♭–E♭/G–Fm–C–D♭–A♭/E♭–E♭^{7}–A♭; in Roman numeral analysis, I–V^{6}–vi–V/vi–IV–I^{6}_{4}–V^{7}–I) bears some resemblance to that of Pachelbel's Canon. The verses, on the other hand, have mostly the same melody (with some minor simplifications) in modern renditions as they did in 1857. The origin of the simpler, modern refrain is unknown, but it dates back at least 1898, when the oldest surviving phonograph recording of the song was released through Edison Records.

The "Jingle Bells" tune is used in French and German songs, although the lyrics are unrelated to the English lyrics. Both songs celebrate winter fun, as in the English version. The French song, titled "Vive le vent" ("Long Live the Wind"), was written by Francis Blanche and contains references to Father Time, Baby New Year, and New Year's Day. There are several German versions of "Jingle Bells", including Roy Black's "Ein kleiner weißer Schneemann".

== Parodies and homages ==
External videos
- Results from a survey of over 64,000 people for most common variations of the parody.
- I Asked 64,182 People About “Jingle Bells, Batman Smells”. Here's What I Found Out. Tom Scott (presenter), June 2020

Like many simple, catchy, and popular melodies, "Jingle Bells" is often the subject of parody, and has been since the mid-1880s. "Jingle Bells, Batman Smells" has been a well-known parody since the mid-1960s, with many variations of the lyrics. The parody has been referenced several times in Batman media. Notably, it is sung by the Joker in the second episode of Batman: The Animated Series, "Christmas with the Joker". It is also sung by Bart Simpson in the series premiere of The Simpsons, "Simpsons Roasting on an Open Fire", which led the series to be misattributed with creating the parody. It is also sung in the Robot Chicken episode, "Robot Chicken's DP Christmas Special".

Other parodies of "Jingle Bells" have been sung by children since the early 1950s. "Jingle Bells, Shotgun Shells" involves a ride in a Ford Model A or a Chevrolet. Other parodies involve G.I. Joe killing Santa Claus and a skiing accident.

Other parodies or novelty versions of "Jingle Bells" have been recorded by many artists, and include Yogi Yorgesson's "Yingle Bells", Da Yoopers' "Rusty Chevrolet", Bucko and Champs' "Aussie Jingle Bells", The Three Stooges' "Jingle Bell Drag", and Jeff Dunham's "Jingle Bombs", performed in his "Achmed the Dead Terrorist" sketch. Another popular spoof of the song is "Pumpkin Bells", a "Pumpkin Carol" which celebrates Halloween and the "Great Pumpkin". It originated in The Peanuts Book of Pumpkin Carols, a booklet based on the Peanuts comic strip and published by Hallmark Cards in the 1960s.

The Australian "Aussie Jingle Bells" written by Colin Buchanan, broadly translates the idea of the original song to the summertime Christmas of the Southern Hemisphere, making reference to a Holden ute and Kelpie.

Musical notation for the chorus of "Jingle Bells" Play

"Jingle Bell Rock" by Bobby Helms pays homage to "Jingle Bells", directly referencing the source song's lyrics, but with a different melody. Originally recorded and released by Helms in a rockabilly style, "Jingle Bell Rock" has itself since become a Christmas standard.

"Tintinabulations" is a novelty arrangement of the song for full orchestra by American Katherine W. Punwar. It consists of 19th and 20th century stylistic variations of "Jingle Bells" and is sometimes performed by classical orchestras for their Christmas concerts.

The first notes in the chorus have become a motif that has been inserted into recordings of other Christmas songs, most notably at the beginning and end of Bing Crosby's "It's Beginning to Look a Lot Like Christmas"; a guitar passage at the end of Nat King Cole's "The Christmas Song" as well as Alabama's "Christmas in Dixie"; and Clarence Clemons performing a saxophone solo in the middle of Bruce Springsteen's "Merry Christmas Baby". A piano is also heard playing these notes at the end of Springsteen's version of "Santa Claus Is Comin' to Town" and Mud's "Lonely This Christmas". A slow version of the chorus opening forms the conclusion of Stan Freberg's 1957 "Green Chri$tma$", interspersed with cash-register noises. Mariah Carey utilizes a bit of the melody in her song "When Christmas Comes". Joni Mitchell's 1971 song "River" begins with a melancholy version of the chorus on piano.

== Charts ==
=== Frank Sinatra version ===
Chart positions for "Jingle Bells"
Chart (2013–2026)	Peak position
Australia (ARIA)	37
Austria (Ö3 Austria Top 40)	25
Belgium (Ultratop 50 Wallonia)	39
Canada Hot 100 (Billboard)	26
France (SNEP)	28
Germany (GfK)	32
Global 200 (Billboard)	23
Greece International (IFPI)	29
Ireland (IRMA)	46
Italy (FIMI)	16
Lithuania (AGATA)	38
Netherlands (Single Top 100)	84
Portugal (AFP)	43
Slovakia Singles Digital (ČNS IFPI)	70
Sweden (Sverigetopplistan)	52
Switzerland (Schweizer Hitparade)	25
UK Singles (Official Charts)	60
US Billboard Hot 100	16

=== Peter Alexander version ===
Chart position for "Jingle Bells (Schlittenfahrt)"
Chart (1965)	Peak position
West Germany (GfK)	38

=== Judge Dread version ===
Chart position for "Jingle Bells/Hokey Cokey"
Chart (1978)	Peak position
UK Singles (Official Charts)	64

=== Moustache version ===
Chart position for "Jingle Bells"
Chart (1980)	Peak position
Belgium (Ultratop 50 Flanders)	23

=== Hysterics version ===
Chart position for "Jingle Bells (Laughing All the Way)"
Chart (1981)	Peak position
UK Singles (Official Charts)	44

=== Confetti's version ===
Chart positions for "Circling Stars (Jingle Bells)"
Chart (1990)	Peak position
Belgium (Ultratop 50 Flanders)	5
France (SNEP)	19
Netherlands (Single Top 100)	91

=== Yello version ===
Chart positions for "Jingle Bells"
Chart (1995–2024)	Peak position
Finland (Suomen virallinen lista)	7
Poland (Polish Airplay Top 100)	46
Sweden (Sverigetopplistan)	49
Switzerland (Schweizer Hitparade)	34

=== Johann K. version ===
Chart position for "Jingle Bells"
Chart (2003)	Peak position
Austria (Ö3 Austria Top 40)	11

=== Crazy Frog version ===
Chart positions for "Jingle Bells/U Can't Touch This" or "Jingle Bells/Last Christmas"
Chart (2005)	Peak position
Australia (ARIA)	4
Belgium (Ultratop 50 Flanders)	2
Belgium (Ultratop 50 Wallonia)	3
France (SNEP)	5
Netherlands (Single Top 100)	32
New Zealand (Recorded Music NZ)	1
Spain (Promusicae)	1
Sweden (Sverigetopplistan)	10
UK Singles (Official Charts)	5

=== Kimberley Locke version ===
Chart position for "Jingle Bells"
Chart (2006)	Peak position
US Adult Contemporary (Billboard)	1

=== Basshunter version ===
Chart positions for "Jingle Bells"
Chart (2006, 2008)	Peak position
Netherlands (Single Top 100)	31
Norway (VG-lista)	9
Sweden (Sverigetopplistan)	13
UK Singles (Official Charts)	35

=== Glee Cast version ===
==== Weekly charts ====
Weekly chart performance for "Jingle Bells"
Chart (2010–2025)	Peak position
Moldova Airplay (TopHit)	29
Holiday Digital Song Sales (Billboard)	10

==== Monthly charts ====
Monthly chart performance for "Jingle Bells"
Chart (2025)	Peak position
Moldova Airplay (TopHit)	70

=== Michael Bublé and the Puppini Sisters version ===
Chart positions for "Jingle Bells"
Chart (2011–2024)	Peak position
Australia (ARIA)	24
Global 200 (Billboard)	134
Hungary (Single Top 40)	40
Hungary (Stream Top 40)	18
Italy (FIMI)	16
Netherlands (Single Top 100)	56
New Zealand (Recorded Music NZ)	26
Sweden (Sverigetopplistan)	56
UK Streaming Chart (OCC)	77

=== 3js version ===
Chart position for "Jingle Bells"
Chart (2014)	Peak position
Belgium (Ultratip Bubbling Under Flanders)	83

=== Jim Reeves version ===
Chart position for "Jingle Bells"
Chart (2015)	Peak position
Sweden (Sverigetopplistan)	92

=== Diana Krall version ===
Chart position for "Jingle Bells"
Chart (2015)	Peak position
Hungary (Stream Top 40)	30

=== Lauren Daigle version ===
Chart position for "Jingle Bells"
Chart (2017)	Peak position
US Christian Airplay (Billboard)	3

=== Sam Ryder version ===
Chart position for "Jingle Bells"
Chart (2022)	Peak position
UK Singles (Official Charts)	41

=== Meghan Trainor version ===
Chart positions for "Jingle Bells"
Chart (2023–2024)	Peak position
Global 200 (Billboard)	200
UK Singles (Official Charts)	48
US Billboard Hot 100	78
US Adult Contemporary (Billboard)	25

== Certifications ==
=== Frank Sinatra version ===
Region	Certification	Certified units/sales
Germany (BVMI)	Gold	300,000^{‡}
Italy (FIMI)	Gold	35,000^{‡}
New Zealand (RMNZ)	Gold	15,000^{‡}
Portugal (AFP)	Gold	12,000^{‡}
United Kingdom (BPI)	Gold	400,000^{‡}
Streaming
Greece (IFPI Greece) 1999 remaster	Gold	1,000,000^{†}
^{‡} Sales+streaming figures based on certification alone.^{†} Streaming-only figures based on certification alone.

=== Michael Bublé and the Puppini Sisters version ===
Region	Certification	Certified units/sales
Denmark (IFPI Danmark)	Gold	45,000^{‡}
Italy (FIMI)	Platinum	70,000^{‡}
New Zealand (RMNZ)	Gold	15,000^{‡}
United Kingdom (BPI)	Gold	400,000^{‡}
^{‡} Sales+streaming figures based on certification alone.

== See also ==
- List of Christmas carols
