= Second Week of Deer Camp =

Single by Da Yoopers

from the album Culture Shock
- B-side: "My Car Won't Go"
- Released: 1987
- Genre: Novelty
- Length: 3:03
- Label: You Guys
- Songwriters: Jim DeCaire; Joe Potila
- Producers: Jim DeCaire; Joe Potila

"Second Week of Deer Camp" is a song by American novelty music band Da Yoopers. It was released in 1987 as a single from their second album Culture Shock. The band's co-founders Jim DeCaire and Joe Potila wrote the song.

== History ==
Da Yoopers were founded in Ishpeming, Michigan by Jim DeCaire and Joe Potila in the 1970s. By the mid-1980s the band had recorded two albums: Yoopanese and Culture Shock, the latter of which contains "Second Week of Deer Camp". At the time, drummer and vocalist Jim DeCaire recorded the band's music in his basement and distributed audiocassettes from his living room. One of these tapes was sent to radio host Dr. Demento, who played it frequently on his radio show. The song was also popular on radio stations in Sioux Falls, South Dakota and in West Virginia. According to DeCaire, the band sold more than 30,000 copies of Culture Shock.

"Second Week of Deer Camp" is a novelty song about a group of men who partake in deer hunting in a camp in the Upper Peninsula of Michigan. Despite their efforts, they state that they "shoot the bull but never shoot no deer." An uncredited article from the Associated Press described the song as having a "polka beat". Both this publication and David Hacker of the Detroit Free Press noted the Yooper dialect in Potila's singing voice. At the time, many disc jockeys who played the song noted it was requested most frequently by women whose husbands were hunting, as well as the hunters themselves.

Ten years after the song's original release in 1987, the band filmed a music video for "Second Week of Deer Camp" on their video album It's About Time, Eh! The video featured guitarist Jim Bellmore, who replaced Potila in 1995.

== Legacy ==
On their 1991 album Yoopy Do Wah, Da Yoopers released a sequel song titled "Second Week of Deer Camp Part II". In 1995, the song appeared on Dr. Demento 25th Anniversary Collection, a compilation of songs that were popular on Dr. Demento's radio show.

== See also ==
- "Da Turdy Point Buck", another 1980s novelty song about deer hunting, released by Bananas at Large
