= Stevens & Grdnic =

- Genres: Comedy
- Members: Ron Stevens; Joy Grdnic

Stevens & Grdnic (Ron Stevens and Joy Grdnic, the latter's surname pronounced "GRID-nick") are American comedians having worked as market radio morning hosts, and written for network TV comedies.

== Overview ==
They released two comedy albums, Somewhere over the Radio and Retail Comedy at Wholesale Prices, the latter featuring the sketches "Fast Food" and "Mr Wizard & Timmy", a parody of Watch Mr. Wizard. Fast Food is a two-and-a-half minute audio comedy skit about a frustrating encounter at a fast-food drive-thru where a customer tries to order "a double cheeseburger, onion rings and a large orange drink." The skit was first broadcast on radio on 4 July 1982, but written and performed earlier.

Stevens & Grdnic's work is syndicated on more than 450 radio stations by All Star Radio Networks, and some of their recordings have been featured on Dr. Demento's radio show.

Their recording "Commercials on 45", inspired by Stars on 45 medleys, consisted of parodies of commercials set to music.
