= Air Cushion Restraint System =

1970s General Motors airbag technology

The Air Cushion Restraint System (ACRS) was developed by General Motors in the early 1970s, and consisted of both a driver's and passenger's side air bag, along with a lap belt and status indicator light. The system was first installed in a test fleet of 1,000 1973 Chevrolet Impala 4-door sedans, painted in a unique green color. The exterior of these Impalas were identical to regular 1973 production models, but used a 1974-style Oldsmobile instrument panel and brand-new steering wheel design. The chassis of these cars were reinforced, and each Impala was equipped with a high-performance 350 cubic-inch V8 engine, the same one used in the Corvette.

ACRS used impact sensors mounted in the vehicle's front bumper in order to deploy the airbags, one of which was installed in a unique four-spoke steering wheel, and the other installed in the dashboard on the passenger side of the vehicle. The passenger-side airbag was a "dual-stage" airbag, meaning that the impact sensors determined the force used to deploy the airbag based on the severity of the impact.

Of the original fleet of Chevrolets, virtually all were eventually disposed of except one, which is currently fully restored. The only reported fatality was an unrestrained infant killed in a crash when the passenger's side airbag deployed in one of the Impalas.

In the early 1990s, two of the original test Impalas were located, one in a junkyard, the other, stored in a shed. Although in rundown condition, both cars were able to refurbished enough to be crash-tested, and the airbags deployed perfectly in both vehicles.

Due to success of the test fleet, GM decided to offer the ACRS as an option for full-size Cadillacs, Oldsmobiles, and Buicks for the 1974 model year. Only 10,000 ACRS units were installed for the life of the option, and buyers of these as used cars often were not even aware that they had the airbags, unless they deployed in a collision. GM advertised the system and it worked well, saving lives. ACRS-optioned cars were exempt from the 1974 Federal seat-belt standard that required belts to be fastened before the engine would start. Lap belts were provided for front seat passengers. Front shoulder belts were considered unnecessary, and were not provided. However, GM felt not enough were purchased to justify the cost of producing it, so the option was withdrawn after the 1976 model year.

The ACRS system was coded as Regular Production Option AR3.

GM did not introduce air bags on their automobiles again until the 1988 model year as a $350 option on the Oldsmobile Delta 88.
