= Da Yoopers =

Band and sketch comedy group from the Upper Peninsula of Michigan

- Origin: Ishpeming, Michigan, US
- Genres: Comedy; novelty
- Years active: 1985–present
- Label: You Guys
- Members: Lynn Bellmore; Jim "Hoolie" DeCaire; Jim Bellmore
- Past members: See list of members
- Website: Official website

Da Yoopers are an American comedy and novelty musical group from Ishpeming, Michigan. They are known primarily for their comedic songs and skits, most of which center on life in the Upper Peninsula of Michigan. The band's name includes the term "yooper", slang for residents of that part of the state, and the use of "da" instead of "the" is typical of the Yooper dialect.

The band's members are Jim Bellmore (guitar, bass guitar, vocals, songwriting, production) and his wife, Lynn Bellmore (née Anderson; also formerly Lynn Coffey) (keyboards, vocals), along with Jim "Hoolie" DeCaire (drums, vocals, songwriting, production). The original band lineup consisted of Anderson and DeCaire, along with Joe Potila (guitar, vocals, songwriting, production) and Jim Pennell (bass guitar, vocals), with a number of membership changes ensuing throughout the band's history.

Da Yoopers have released twelve studio albums and two compilation albums, all through their own You Guys Records label.

== History ==
Jim "Hoolie" DeCaire and Joe Potila, two songwriters from Ishpeming, Michigan, began writing music together in 1975. After unsuccessful attempts at getting songs cut by other artists, they began recording as Da Yoopers in 1985. The band's original lineup consisted of DeCaire on drums and Potila on guitar, with both also handling songwriting and production duties; completing the initial lineup were keyboardist Lynn Anderson and bassist Jim Pennell. All four founding members also alternated as vocalists. They were originally known as the Joe Arkansas Band, but chose to change their name to one more reflective of their sound. The band took their name from the word "yooper", a term for people of the "U.P.", an abbreviation for the Upper Peninsula of Michigan, and "Da" came from the Yooper dialect pronunciation of "the".

The band toured throughout Michigan's Upper Peninsula for several years, before recording their first album, Yoopanese, in 1986 on their personal label, You Guys Records. At the time, Potila was a student of film at Northern Michigan University in nearby Marquette, where Anderson was also manager of an optometry center and Pennell repaired engines. Following Yoopanese, the band released a stand-alone single titled "Rusty Chevrolet". The song is a parody of "Jingle Bells", and is about a man who owns a run-down Chevrolet automobile. DeCaire distributed copies of the single to radio stations for $2, with half of the proceeds from single sales being donated to the local Salvation Army. The song received airplay on WIFC, a radio station in Wausau, Wisconsin; in response, DeCaire visited the station in December 1986 and sold approximately a thousand copies of the single to listeners. The Wausau Daily Herald also reported that the song began receiving airplay on stations in Alaska and Maine.

A second album, Culture Shock, was released in 1987. In addition to the existing "Rusty Chevrolet", the album included "Second Week of Deer Camp". This song also received considerable airplay throughout the Midwestern United States and on Dr. Demento's radio shows. According to The La Crosse Tribune, "Second Week of Deer Camp" received airplay on stations in South Dakota and West Virginia, as well as on the Satellite Music Network's Pure Gold radio show, at the time based out of Dallas, Texas, and airing on more than 160 radio networks in the United States.

By the release of Camp Fever, the band's third album, Joe DeLongchamp had replaced Pennell on bass guitar. In addition, Lynn Anderson married Jerry Coffey, who joined as percussionist and occasional drummer. It also included the first song of the band's career not to be written by Potila or DeCaire, as DeLongchamp wrote the title track.

This was followed in 1989 by Yoop It Up, their fourth cassette. The album features DeCaire's son Jesse singing lead vocals on "Yooper Kid". Another track on the album is "Diarrhea", cited by Pam Tonge (then the manager of the band's office) as a fan favorite. The band promoted this album through concert tours in 1990, by which point Dave "Doc" Bradbury had replaced DeLongchamp on bass guitar.

=== Early 1990s–present ===
Yoopy Do Wah, released in 1991, was the band's first album on compact disc. This album was promoted through a single titled "DJ Blues". Also that year, a compilation titled For Diehards Only was released, featuring a selection of songs from the group's first four albums. Da Yoopers' 1993 album One Can Short of a Six-Pack featured both regular and Christmas songs, including a parody of "Grandma Got Run Over by a Reindeer" titled "Grandpa Got Run Over By a Beer Truck". Joe Potila retired in 1995 and was replaced by Jim Bellmore, who also assumed Potila's former role as co-writer and co-producer with DeCaire. Also at this point "Cowboy" Dan Collins joined as rhythm guitarist and occasional vocalist. Bellmore's first studio appearance was on We're Still Rockin' that same year. Potila died in 2001.

Two albums were released in 2000: Jackpine Savage and Naked Elves in Cowboy Boots, the latter an album of Christmas music. By this point, Bobby "Sy" Symons had become the band's touring drummer, although DeCaire continued to play drums in studio. Both Dan Collins and Jerry Coffey left shortly after Naked Elves in Cowboy Boots. Songs for Fart Lovers and Diehards II (a second compilation composed of songs from the first four albums) both came out in 2004, with the two-disc 21st Century Yoopers in Space following in 2006. This album also featured several guest contributions in both performing and songwriting. Lynn, who divorced Jerry in 2005, was again credited as Lynn Anderson on 21st Century Yoopers in Space, and married Bellmore shortly after that album's release. The last touring lineup consisted of the Bellmores, Lusardi, Symons, and DeCaire.

The band retired from touring in 2013, but have continued to perform locally in Michigan. Reggie Lusardi died May 8, 2016. The band's 2018 album Old Age Ain't for Sissies! features the Bellmores and DeCaire as the remaining three members. Symons died August 20, 2020.

== Tourist Trap ==
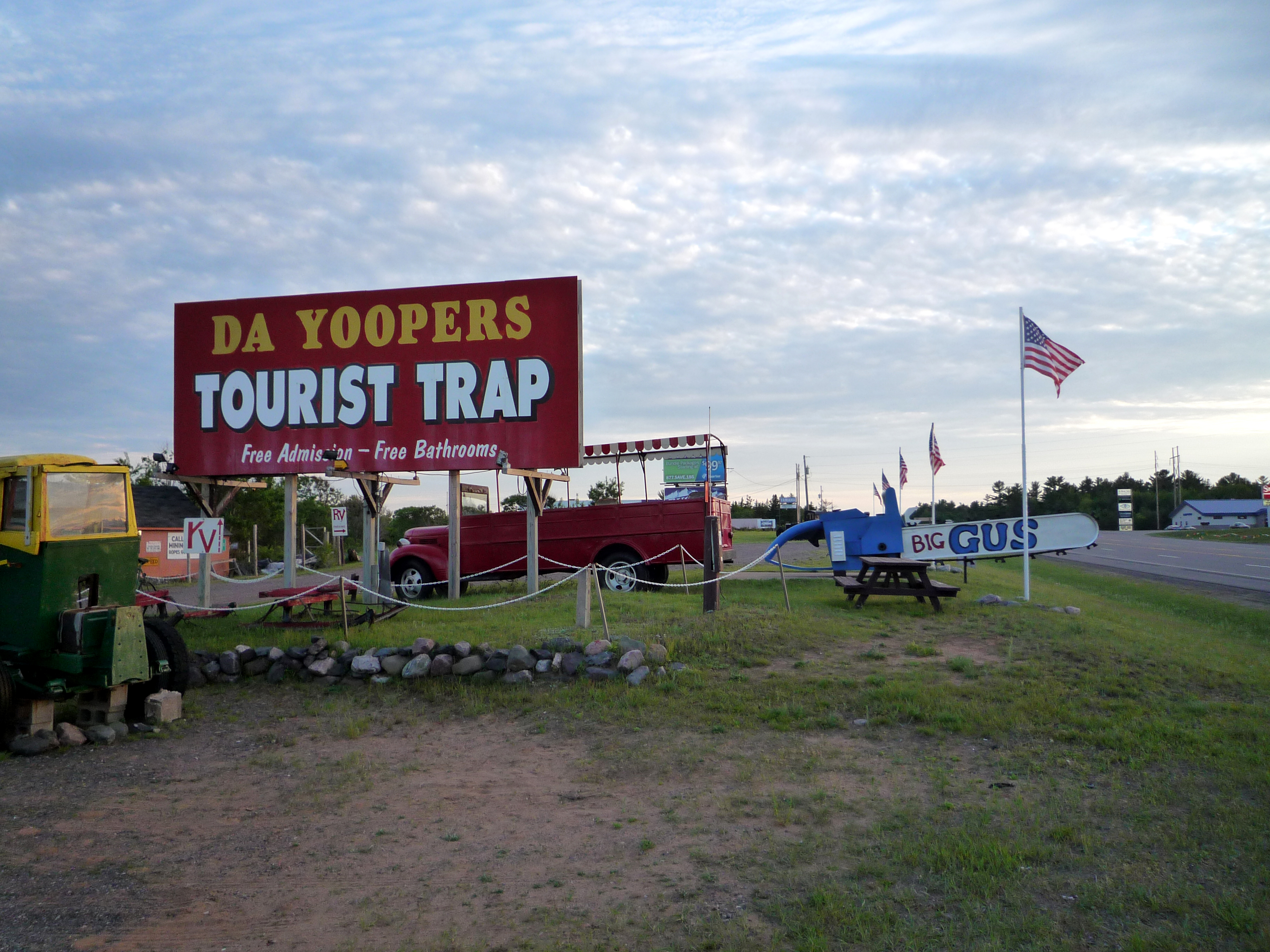
Da Yoopers Tourist Trap features the world's biggest chainsaw, Big Gus, as well as other intentionally gaudy museum items and merchandise.

Da Yoopers also own and operate a gift shop near Ishpeming called "Da Yoopers Tourist Trap", featuring various Upper Peninsula-themed merchandise.

Da Yooper's tourist trap not only contains merchandise, but two museums as well. The first museum is a mineral museum that contains various minerals found in the Upper Peninsula of Michigan. It also has exhibits related to the local mining culture. This museum is found inside of Da Yooper's Tourist Trap. The other museum is an outdoor museum that is more oriented towards humor. It contains such things as a large chainsaw called Big Gus, a large rifle called Big Ernie and Da Two-Holer (an outhouse with the seat below another opening with a Yooper dummy). This comedic museum has various other displays which tourists are encouraged to see in order to understand the humor of the Yooper culture.

== Members ==
The band's membership is:

- Jim Bellmore: guitar, bass guitar, vocals
- Lynn Bellmore: keyboards, vocals
- Jim "Hoolie" DeCaire: drums, vocals

=== Former members ===
- Glenn Adams: sketch comedy (died 2026)
- Jim Boyer: sketch comedy
- Dave "Doc" Bradbury: bass guitar, vocals (died 2024)
- Matt Bullock: sketch comedy
- Dick "Dick E. Bird" Bunce: bass guitar, sketch comedy (died 2022)
- Steve Calhoun: sketch comedy
- Jerry "Cuppa" Coffey: drums, percussion, vocals, sketch comedy
- "Cowboy" Dan Collins: rhythm guitar, drums, vocals, sketch comedy
- Art Davis: sketch comedy
- Joe DeLongchamp: bass guitar, vocals, sketch comedy
- Chris Kukla: sketch comedy
- Jerry "Mungo" LaJoie: sketch comedy
- Pete "Casanova" LaLonde: sketch comedy
- "Billy Bob" Langson: sketch comedy
- Reggie Lusardi: bass guitar, vocals, sketch comedy (died 2016)
- Robert "Dill" Nebel: sketch comedy
- Jim Pennell: bass guitar, vocals
- Joe Potila: lead guitar, vocals, sketch comedy (died 2001)
- Mike "Mikku" Powers: sketch comedy
- Bobby Symons: drums (died 2020)

== Discography ==
All albums released on You Guys Records.

Studio albums

Album	Release
Yoopanese	1986
Culture Shock	1987
Camp Fever	1988
Yoop It Up	1989
Yoopy Do Wah	1991
One Can Short of a 6-Pack	1994
We're Still Rockin'	1996
Jackpine Savage	1999
Naked Elves in Cowboy Boots	2000
Songs for Fart Lovers	2003
21st Century Yoopers in Space	2006
Old Age Ain’t for Sissies!	2018

Compilations

Album	Release
For Diehards Only	1992
Diehards II	2004
