= Malinda Jackson Parker =

Liberian musician

Malinda Jackson Parker

Malinda Jackson Parker (c. 1903 – 1978) was a Liberian singer and pianist. She composed her own music and recorded the album The Liberian Landmark Joy around 1971. She served a term in the House of Representatives of Liberia representing Montserrado County. A well-known figure in Monrovia, she graduated from Morgan College in Baltimore. Her songs were included in Irwin Chusid's 1999 compilation albums Songs in the Key of Z, which considered her an outsider artist.

== Early life and education ==
Malinda Jackson Parker was born around 1903, in Louisiana, Montserrado County. Her parents were Selina Malinda Jackson and Gabriel Parker, a pastor and musician who served in the Senate of Liberia for 28 years. She attended school in Clay-Ashland and graduated from the College of West Africa in Monrovia. Parker traveled to the United States on a government scholarship, where she studied classical piano and graduated from Morgan College in Baltimore. She wrote a dissertation entitled Africa's Need of an Industrial Education.

== Musical career ==
After returning to Liberia, she collaborated with blind composer Howard Benedict Hayes. Parker composed marches, political praise songs, and political hymns. Her vocal style has been compared to Nina Simone and Lucia Pamela. Her songs were included in the compilation Songs of the African Coast: Café Music of Liberia. Parker donated a piano to the Liberia Broadcasting System, reportedly with the guarantee that she would be allowed time on-air whenever she requested.

During William Tubman's presidency, Parker served as a representative for Montserrado County in the House of Representatives of Liberia for a term in the 1950s. She worked to uphold the rights of artists.

Parker recorded the album The Liberian Landmark Joy, released as Congresswoman Malinda Jackson Parker, in the United Kingdom around 1971. The album was also known as Tubman Goodtype Songs of Liberia. She wrote her own songs, half spoken and half sung, and provided her own accompaniment on piano. The album's songs include odes to palm trees and bush cow (African forest buffalo) milk. In her song "Cousin Mosquito", she addresses the ability of mosquitoes to spread disease and repeats the word "cousin" 204 times. In another variation on "Cousin Mosquito", she draws on musical phrasing from Sergei Rachmaninoff's Prelude in C-sharp minor. Her song "Chicken is Nice (with Palm Butter and Rice)" was composed by Howard B. Hayes and became a popular song in Liberia.

Parker was well known in Monrovia and was called "Ma Parker". She would hand out candy to children, and was described as independently wealthy. She was known for her unusual makeup and fashioning herself in "blindingly colourful robes and turbans". She was known to enjoy Jacob's Cream Crackers, peppermints, and Gordon's Gin.

Parker died in Sinkor in 1978. She was labelled an "outsider artist" in Irwin Chusid's 1999 book and compilation albums Songs in the Key of Z, which included her songs "Cousin Mosquito #1" and "Cousin Mosquito # 2". She was inducted into the Dehkontee Artists Theatre Hall of Fame in 2017.
