= Downloading the Repertoire =

Live album by Jack Mudurian
- Released: 1996
- Recorded: June 15, 1981
- Venue: Duplex Nursing Home, Boston, Massachusetts
- Label: Arf! Arf! Records; AA-057

Downloading the Repertoire is a 1996 album by American singer John "Jack" Mudurian (May 23, 1929 – September 30, 2013). It consists of an uncut, a cappella field recording of Mudurian, in a stream of consciousness, singing a battery of mostly show tunes, old country-western and folk music, and Tin Pan Alley standards.

Mudurian was a resident of Duplex Nursing Home in Boston, Massachusetts. In 1981, David Greenberger, an employee who also edited the zine The Duplex Planet, overheard Mudurian singing at a home talent show, and when Greenberger spoke to him about it, Mudurian boasted that he could sing as many songs as Frank Sinatra. Greenberger brought in a cassette tape recorder and asked him to sing; Mudurian proceeded to sing 129 songs, many from the Tin Pan Alley repertory (and several more than once), continuously over the next 47 minutes.

The recording was issued as Downloading the Repertoire on Arf! Arf! Records in 1996, and it became a cult novelty hit. Neil Strauss, writing about the recording for The New York Times, wrote: "What is most interesting about this CD is not Mr. Mudurian's slurred, rushed singing but the way his entire life story unfolds in his selection of material." In a review for AllMusic, Cub Koda commented: "[Mudurian's]... free association from tune to tune is downright astounding. No matter what kind of music you might have in your collection, it's a good bet you don't have anything that sounds quite like this." A reviewer for CMJ New Music Monthly described the album as "a hysterical, bizarre tour through the history of American popular song."

A shortened version of the music heard on Downloading appeared on Irwin Chusid's compilation of outsider music called Songs in the Key of Z, Vol. 1. Mudurian can also be heard on the compilations The Talent Show (1996), and The Tarquin Records All Star Holiday Extravaganza (2000). After meeting Mudurian, singer Jad Fair transcribed his version of "Chicago (That Toddlin' Town)" and performed it in his own live shows.

According to Greenberger, the nursing home at which Mudurian resided closed in 1987, and the two lost touch. Greenberger, who affectionately referred to the marathon recording session as "Jack's and my private Olympic event," recalled: "That June afternoon lives on for me. Planes flew overhead, birds chirped in the trees and another resident... could be heard singing in the background from time to time."

== Songs sung on Downloading the Repertoire ==
(in order of songs sung)

1. Chicago (That Toddlin' Town)
2. It's Been a Long, Long Time
3. Why Am I Always Yearning for Theresa
4. The Halls of Montezuma
5. So Long It's Been Good to Know You
6. Step Right Up (and Help Old Uncle Sam)
7. It's Only a Paper Moon
8. Music! Music! Music! (Put Another Nickel In)
9. Take Me Out to the Ball Game
10. Some Sunday Morning
11. Any Bonds Today?
12. Red River Valley
13. My Bonnie
14. Jimmy Crack Corn
15. The Wabash Cannonball
16. I Wonder Who's Kissing Her Now
17. Ramona
18. Toot Toot Tootsie! (Goo' Bye)
19. If You Knew Susie Like I Know Susie
20. I Don't Care If the Sun Don't Shine
21. I Love My Baby (My Baby Loves Me)
22. I'll See You in My Dreams
23. Lucky Me
24. I Don't Know Why (I Just Do)
25. Near You
26. South of the Border (Down Mexico Way)
27. I've Been Working on the Railroad
28. Goody-Goody
29. Home on the Range
30. Joshua Fit the Battle of Jericho
31. Bell Bottom Trousers
32. Ragtime Cowboy Joe
33. Over the Rainbow
34. When You Wish Upon a Star
35. Pistol Packin' Mama
36. Frankie and Johnnie
37. Rudolph the Red-Nosed Reindeer
38. Jingle Bells
39. I Love You
40. Cuddle Up a Little Closer
41. Ain't She Sweet
42. Rose O'Day (The Filla-Ga-Dusha Song)
43. The Band Played On
44. Sparrow in the Treetop
45. "Pep Talk"/South of the Border (Down Mexico Way)
46. It's Only a Paper Moon
47. California, Here I Come
48. Row, Row, Row Your Boat
49. Singin' in the Rain
50. Five Foot Two, Eyes of Blue
51. Lullaby Of Broadway
52. I Wonder Who's Kissing Her Now
53. Some Sunday Morning
54. For Me and My Gal
55. Blue Skies
56. Smoke That Cigarette
57. Ain't Misbehavin'
58. Cheek to Cheek
59. Let's Call the Whole Thing Off
60. I've Got a Lovely Bunch of Coconuts (Roll or Bowl a Ball-A Penny a Pitch)
61. Michael Row the Boat Ashore
62. Row, Row, Row Your Boat
63. When You Wish Upon a Star
64. I'll See You in My Dreams
65. Chiquita Banana
66. Your Cheatin' Heart
67. Sparrow in the Treetop
68. Rock Around the Clock
69. That Old Flying Machine
70. The Man on the Flying Trapeze
71. School Days
72. Take Me Out to the Ball Game
73. Johnson Rag
74. Sugarfoot Rag
75. Chicago (That Toddling Town)
76. Pistol Packin' Mama
77. Boola Boola
78. Honeysuckle Rose
79. Volare
80. Quando Quando Quando (Tell Me When)
81. San Antonio Rose
82. Ragtime Cowboy Joe
83. Chattanooga Choo Choo
84. The Trolley Song
85. "Pep Talk"/Sing Sing Sing
86. Goody Goody
87. "Pep Talk"/Pistol Packin' Mama
88. Any Bonds Today
89. Music Music Music! (Put Another Nickel In)
90. It's Only a Paper Moon
91. Melody Time
92. When Irish Eyes Are Smiling
93. Heartaches
94. Night and Day
95. The Band Played On
96. Rose O'Day (The Filla-Ga-Dusha Song)
97. The Wabash Cannonball
98. "Pep Talk"/Pistol Packin' Mama
99. The Halls Of Montezuma
100. Jingle Bell Rock
101. I'll Never Say "Never Again" Again
102. Million Dollar Baby
103. Shine on Harvest Moon
104. Carolina in the Morning
105. You Must Have Been a Beautiful Baby
106. Jimmy Crack Corn
107. Any Bonds Today
108. Rose O'Day (The Filla-Ga-Dusha Song)
109. Michael Row the Boat Ashore
110. Three Blind Mice
111. Ramona
112. Mona Lisa
113. Bye Bye Baby
114. My Baby Just Cares for Me
115. Five Foot Two Eyes of Blue
116. If You Knew Susie Like I Know Susie
117. That's Amore
118. The Music Goes 'Round And Around
119. Jeepers Creepers
120. Some Sunday Morning
121. Alexander's Ragtime Band
122. Any Bonds Today
123. I Don't Want to Set the World on Fire
124. Oh What a Gal
125. The Wabash Cannonball
126. My Bonnie
127. Chicago (That Toddling Town)
128. Rose O'Day (The Filla-Ga-Dusha Song)
