= The Space Lady =

American musician

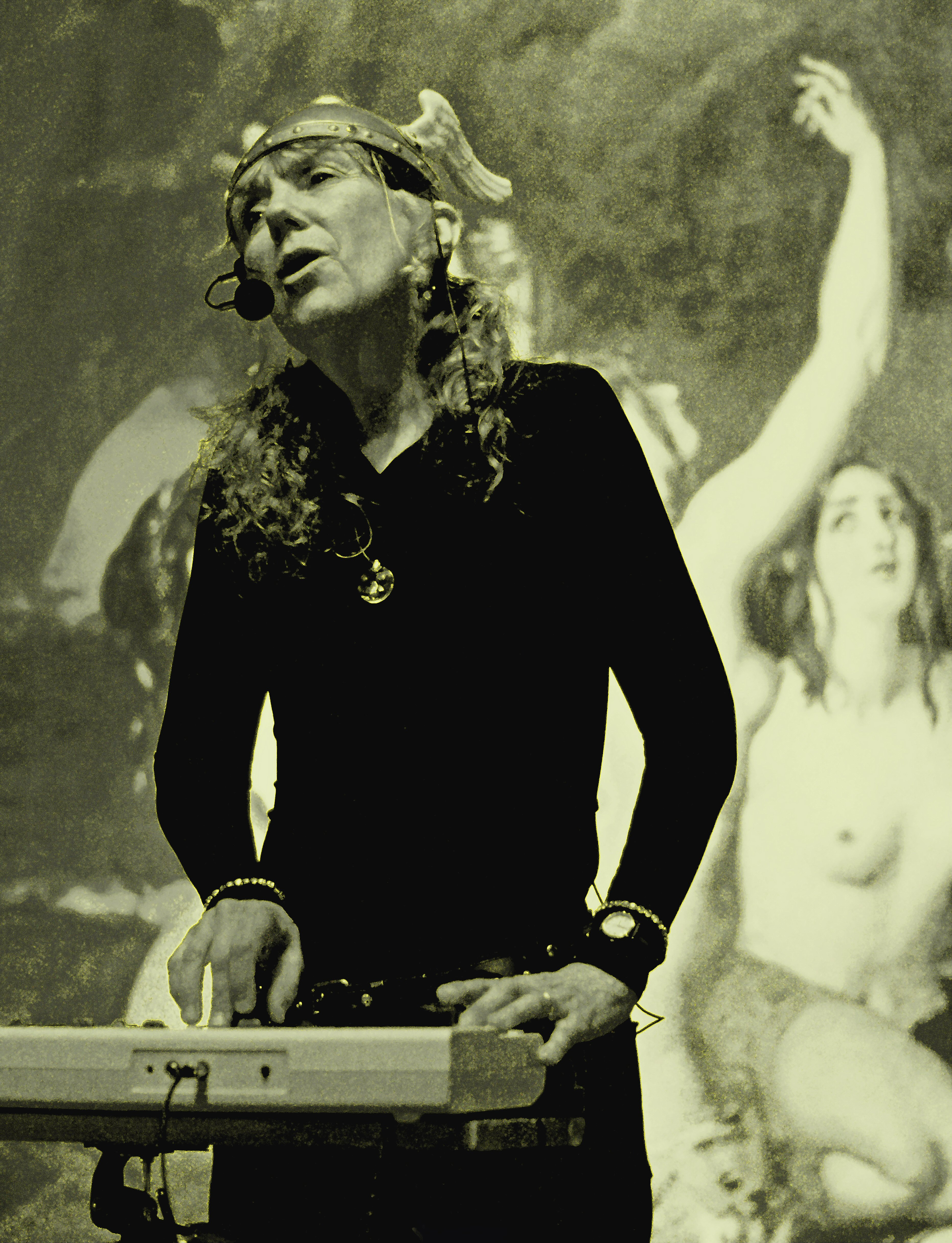
- The Space Lady performing at Manchester Museum, March 30, 2013

Background information
- Also known as: TSL, Suzy Soundz
- Born: 1948 (age 77–78); Pueblo, Colorado
- Origin: United States
- Genres: Space music; synth pop; psychedelic pop; outsider music
- Occupations: Singer; musician; songwriter
- Years active: 1970s–2000 2012–present
- Label: Various
- Members: Susan Dietrich Schneider

Susan Dietrich, known as The Space Lady (TSL) (formerly Suzy Soundz), born 1948 is a singer and musician in the genres of space music, synth pop, and psychedelic pop. She is also a paragon of the genre known as outsider music.

== Performing career ==
In the 1960s, Dietrich hitchhiked to San Francisco, getting a ride from Joel Dunsany, a.k.a. the Cosmic Man, a musician who would later become her husband for the next 30 years. In the 1980s and 1990s, Dietrich was a street musician in Boston, Massachusetts and San Francisco, first playing accordion to accompany her gentle soprano voice. From 1984 to 2000 she would generally perform in the Castro or the Haight or in BART stations. Wearing a silver plastic helmet with white wings and a flashing red light on top (which she performs in to this day), and playing haunting ethereal covers of rock 'n roll classics, Dietrich got the name "The Space Lady" from fans and from a newspaper contest. She upgraded from accordion in 1983 to the then-new Casiotone MT-40 battery-operated keyboard, played through a battery-operated amp. Her classic song "Synthesize Me" was written by her late ex-husband Joel Dunsany, at the time of that change to synthesizer.

Retiring from music in 2000, Dietrich left San Francisco, and returned to Colorado, to care for her aging parents. Attending La Junta's Otero Junior College, she earned a nursing degree, became an RN, and started work as a charge nurse in a nursing home. Her involvement with music narrowed to selling the odd CD ("The Space Lady Live in San Francisco") of recordings she'd made on a cassette recorder in 1990, and later digitized. But a year later, music historian Irwin Chusid released his book and CD-compilation paean to 'Outsider Music,' Songs in the Key of Z. The Vol. II CD included TSL's cover of "I Had Too Much to Dream Last Night" (by Annette Tucker/ Nancie Mantz). Unknown to Dietrich, this led to increased interest in The Space Lady's whereabouts and availability, fueled further by internet-bootlegged copies of her CD.

In 2008, she met – and a year later married – Eric Schneider, himself a songwriter/singer/acoustic guitarist, performing as "Eric Ian" (his actual middle name). Not a pop music fan, Schneider had never heard of The Space Lady. The two formed a duo, with Dietrich accompanying Schneider on his original songs, singing harmonies and playing accordion, alternating with silver flute solos. But it never got off the ground. In 2012, after becoming curious about Dietrich's previous life as The Space Lady, Schneider challenged her to play for him electronically. When she re-assembled her gear, and played Ghost Riders in the Sky for him, he urged her to come out of retirement, and play, not on the street, but in clubs and other indoor venues. When she hesitated, he promised to manage her – calling on his years of experience managing seminars.

She agreed, and – at Schneider's request – sent an email to 1,000+ fans that "The Space Lady is back!" Within days, she had offers from two European record labels to let them release an album. The couple picked London's Night School Records, who produced "The Space Lady's Greatest Hits," in the winter of 2013, containing a dozen remastered tracks from the CD, plus a single with an iconic solarized cover photo of TSL, by San Francisco poet and photographer Tinker Greene.

The Space Lady's "First World Tour" began in March 2014 on the USA West Coast, followed by the UK in April, and Western Europe in October/November. Her tour included not only the new recordings, but T-shirts and a colorful tour poster that she had designed herself. In 2015, The Space Lady embarked on two more tours – one of eastern North America, and a six-week tour of the UK and Western/Central Europe.

== Musicianship ==
Dietrich's parents were classical musicians, her mother being a pianist and her father, a violist. She studied piano and flute as a girl, picked up acoustic guitar while in college, then taught herself to play a keyboard accordion on the streets and in the subways of Boston in the early 80s, before transitioning to electronic music by upgrading to her "trademark" Casiotone MT-40. The Space Lady is probably best known for the covers, e.g. Ghost Riders in the Sky (by Stan Jones) and Major Tom (Coming Home) (by Peter Schilling, in Schilling's English translation with David Lodge). But she also performs other covers, plus several songs composed by Joel Dunsany, as well as her own, e.g., "The Ballad of Captain Jack" and "The Next Right Thing". The latter is featured on her 2015 LP from Castle Face Records, along with covers of "Somewhere Over the Rainbow" (Arlen & Harburg), "Starman" (David Bowie), and "Across the Universe"(Lennon & McCartney).

== Personal life ==
Dietrich was born in Pueblo, CO and grew up in Las Animas, CO, leaving there in 1966 to attend the University of Colorado in Boulder. However, she struggled to find meaningful direction in the academic world. After a little over two years, she joined the hippie movement in San Francisco. Because of Joel Dunsany's fears of being caught and sent to Vietnam or prison, they lived without IDs or jobs, taking a "vow of poverty" in order to protect him and avoid making any contribution to the "Establishment," i.e., the military-industrial complex.

Throughout the 70s they subsisted on their artwork, with Dietrich selling drawings, collages, poetry booklets, and various novelties, like trendy badges, pins, and earrings, on the street. Dunsany had aspired to become a one-man-rock-band, calling himself "The Cosmic Man," and wearing what has now become The Space Lady's winged helmet, but his fear kept him from performing in public, although his engaging personality gained him a couple of enthusiastic followers who drove the two of them to Boston, where they said his music would be well received. Still, no public appearances occurred, and the one-man-band idea was finally abandoned, although Dunsany and Dietrich briefly formed a 4-piece ambient synthesizer and guitar band called "Blind Juggler." That band was short-lived, too, and, except for a cassette of ambient, experimental music called "The Cosmic Man" which was co-created by Dunsany and Dietrich, no more music was forthcoming from the couple until 1980, when Dietrich went out on her own with an old, battered accordion, by now desperate to support a family with a 10-month-old baby.

Two years later, she upgraded to the newly released Casiotone MT-40 and began singing through a mic and delay pedal, wearing the now iconic winged helmet, as well as a couple of other electrified hats Dunsany designed for her. Returning to San Francisco in 1984, she became a hit on the street there, and was dubbed "The Space Lady" by the Berkeley Barb newspaper when she came in second in their Favorite Street Musician contest. The name stuck, and in 1990 she recorded many of her best songs for a cassette which Dunsany hand-produced at home for street sales. But around 1992, Dietrich returned to acoustic music (this time with a better accordion), due to the legal restrictions and costs of playing electronically.

After a total of 20 years playing on the street, she retired in 2000, left Dunsany, and returned to her home state of Colorado to care for her aging parents. She lived with her late singer/songwriter husband and manager Eric Schneider until his death in 2016 in La Junta, Colorado, US. After Schneider’s death, her musical career was managed by her grandson, Skyler Wright, who traveled with her to Europe, Australia, and South America (Brazil). During the 2020 COVID shutdown when all The Space Lady’s tours were cancelled, she took time to re-group and re-connect with nature via hiking and birding and falling in love with her old friend Duane Nelson, who soon became her “significant other” and life partner. As touring opportunities resurged, they began traveling together, Duane acting as road manager and general support person, but declining to be her business manager. With his logistical involvement, touring then became more nature-focused, and they both increased their bird “Life Lists” exponentially with every new country and continent visited, much to The Space Lady’s delight, since nature has always been the main source of her musical inspiration.

== Awards and recognition ==
In 2014 she became even more well-known when her first LP ended up on The Guardian's list of The 101 Strangest Records on Spotify. “Synthesize Me” was used as soundtrack for credits at the end of the documentary film on female pioneers of electronic music, “Sisters With Transistors,” released in 2020.

== Discography ==
- 1984 - The Cosmic Man by Amazing Thingz.
- 1990 – The Space Lady by Amazing Thingz.
- 2004 – Street-level Superstar (Owed to Boston).
- 2013 – The Space Lady's Greatest Hits (Night School Records). Named in Vice Magazine's 50 Best of 2014 and NME's "101 Albums to Hear Before You Die".
- 2015 – The Space Lady/Burnt Ones (Castle Face Records)
- 2016 - The Space Lady's Back! (Audible Love Recording Co.)
- 2018 - ‘On the Street of Dreams’ (Mississippi Records)
- 2019 - ‘The Space Lady’s Greatest Hits’ (re-released by Mississippi Records)
