= Y. Bhekhirst =

American singer

- Also known as: Pepe Díaz Guzmán; Pepe H. Díaz; H. Díaz; H. Díazg; Al Pol; Al Phol; Al Phool; Al Phooz; Al Pheol
- Born: José Hugo Díaz Guzmán; July 15, 1946
- Died: May 23, 2016 (aged 69) Bronx, New York, U.S.
- Genres: Outsider music; Folk
- Occupation: Musician
- Instruments: Vocals, guitar, bass, drums
- Years active: 1986–1994
- Label: HDG Records

Y. Bhekhirst was an outsider musician based in New Hyde Park, New York. He is best known for his album, Hot in the Airport, released in 1994.

== History ==
Little is known about Y. Bhekhirst. His sole known album, Hot in the Airport, self-released in 1994 on New Hyde Park-based label HDG Records, is prized by some outsider music collectors for its decidedly dadaistic, shambling songs. The title track of the album, which has been described as "oblique", was released three years earlier as a double A-sided 7-inch single and has been anthologized in the compilation Interesting Results: Music by a Committee of One. Slightly more polished than the rest of Y's known oeuvre, it includes a number of lines sung in Spanish. According to copyright records, the song was revised at least four times, with the fourth revision (Hot in the Airport (V5)) appearing on the 1991 single.

Irwin Chusid, who brought Bhekhirst's music to the public's attention in the mid-1990s with Songs in the Key of Z, reported that a man calling himself Y. Bhekhirst was distributing his cassettes in New York record stores; Bhekhirst handed the cassettes over to the clerks before walking out abruptly without further explanation. Chusid and former colleague Michelle Boulé played selections from Hot in the Airport on numerous occasions when they worked together at station WFMU.

Searches at the U.S. Copyright Office have revealed that a man named José Hugo Díaz Guzmán (born in 1946 and also known as Pepe Díaz Guzmán) was somehow involved with Y's music, as the name "H. Díaz" or "H. Díazg" shows up on most known releases of material from Hot in the Airport. Some have speculated that Díaz Guzmán and Bhekhirst are the same individual. Under various similar pseudonyms (such as "Al Pol", "Al Phol", "Al Phool" and "Al Phooz"), Díaz Guzmán appears to have copyrighted numerous songs and cassette recordings, the earliest in 1986 and the latest in 1994. Guzmán apparently went by the names Hugo D Bhekhirst and Yrk Bhekhirst, as he appears under this name in several public utility records.

Intriguingly, though Hugo Díaz Guzmán was careful to list most of his apparent aliases as pseudonyms in his copyright filings, "Y. Bhekhirst (1952-)" is credited in at least one filing as a seemingly distinct person with a different year of birth, though this may be a fiction, private joke, or allusion to the date of Y's artistic conception on Guzmán's part. Further complicating matters, the 45 release of Hot in the Airport credits a "Y Bherhirst" [sic] with production, "H. Diazg" with music, and "Al Pol", "Al Phol", and "Al Phool" with having written and/or copyrighted the track, though Bherhirst seems to have been a typo since "Singer: Y. Bhekhirst" has been added with a stamp to all known copies of the 45.

Guzmán may have recorded music beyond that found on Hot in the Airport, including music in Spanish (one copyright is called 'Group songs 1964-1981, 5third [sic] songs group, songs in Spanish'), though none of it seems to have been released.

Díaz Guzmán had a Peruvian national ID (DNI) and resided in Peru for at least part of his life, but it remains unclear if he was born there. He died of unknown causes on May 23, 2016, shortly before his 70th birthday. He is buried on Hart Island, New York City's public cemetery for bodies unclaimed.

== Discography ==
Albums

- Hot in the Airport (1994)

Singles

- Hot in the Airport (V5) (1991)
