= Songs in the Key of Z =

Compilation album

Songs in the Key of Z is a book and two compilation albums written and compiled by Irwin Chusid. The book and albums explore the field of what Chusid coined as "outsider music". Chusid defines outsider music as "crackpot and visionary music, where all trails lead essentially one place: over the edge." Chusid's work has brought the music of several leading performers in the outsider genre to wider attention. These include Daniel Johnston, Joe Meek, Jandek and Wesley Willis. In addition, his CDs feature some recordings by artists who produced very little work but placed their recordings firmly in the outsider area. Notable amongst these are nursing home resident Jack Mudurian who sings snatches of several dozen songs in a garbled collection known as Downloading the Repertoire and the obscure and extreme scat singer Shooby Taylor AKA "The Human Horn".

== The compilation albums ==
Songs in the Key of Z

Compilation album by various artists
- Released: 2000
- Genre: Outsider music
- Labels: Which? Cherry Red

Professional ratings
Review scores
Source	Rating
Dusted	(favorable)
Entertainment Weekly	(B)
Ink19	(favorable)
Pitchfork	9.1/10
PopMatters	(favorable)

Songs in the Key of Z – The Curious Universe of Outsider Music, the companion compilation albums to Chusid's book were released on Which? Records, the first volume originally in 2000, with the two volumes later combined and released by Cherry Red. The collections, compiled by Irwin Chusid, include performances by gay country singer Peter Grudzien, music schoolteacher B. J. Snowden, and Swedish Elvis-impersonator Eilert Pilarm, along with better-known artists such as Daniel Johnston, the Shaggs, Wesley Willis, Joe Meek, and Captain Beefheart. The collections have drawn criticism from some quarters, with Alvin Dahn's wife unhappy with his inclusion in an 'outsider music' compilation, and B. J. Snowden also unhappy with the categorization.

== Track listing ==
=== Vol. 1 ===
1. "Philosophy of the World" – The Shaggs
2. "Walking the Cow" – Daniel Johnston
3. "Walking On The Moon" – Lucia Pamela
4. "Spangled Banner Waving Somewhere" – Peter Grudzien
5. "Downloading the Repertoire" (Excerpt) – Jack Mudurian
6. "Stout-hearted Men" – Shooby Taylor, The Human Horn
7. "In Canada" – B. J. Snowden
8. "Jailhouse Rock" – Eilert Pilarm
9. "Virgin Child of the Universe" – Song poem, Unknown; later identified as gospel singer Dodie Frost
10. "Rock N' Roll McDonald's" – Wesley Willis
11. "Telstar" (Demo) – Joe Meek
12. "At the Grass Roots" – Sri Darwin Gross
13. "Cousin Mosquito #1" – Congress-Woman Malinda Jackson Parker
14. "El Touchy" – Luie Luie
15. "Standing in a Trash Can (Thinking About You)" – Legendary Stardust Cowboy
16. "Vampire Suite" – Captain Beefheart & His Magic Band
17. "Butterfly Mind" – Arcesia
18. "They Told Me I Was a Fool" – Jandek
19. "Baby, Your Love's in Town" – "Dusty Roads" Rowe
20. "True Love" – Tiny Tim With Miss Sue

=== Vol. 2 ===
1. "Lift Every Voice and Sing" – Shooby Taylor
2. "You're Out of the Computer" – Bingo Gazingo & My Robot Friend
3. "Mr. Snuggles" - Dr. Love
4. "America" – B.J. Snowden
5. "You're Driving Me Mad" – Alvin Dahn
6. "Cousin Mosquito # 2" – Congress-Woman Malinda Jackson Parker
7. "I Had Too Much to Dream (Last Night)" – The Space Lady
8. "Touch of Light" – Luie Luie
9. "Curly Toes" – Unknown
10. "Stepping High Dance" – Eddie Murray
11. "5 Ft. 9 1/12 Inches Tall" – Dick Kent
12. "Recitation About Roy Acuff" – Gary Mullis
13. "Deep Bosom Woman" – Wayne
14. "High Speed" – Bob Vido
15. "Herma, Scene 5; Recitation/An" – Thoth
16. "Jet Lady" – Tangela Tricoli
17. "Birthmark Story" – Buddy Max
18. "Heart of the Heartland" – Mark Kennis

=== Vol. 3 ===
1. "Hap-Hap-Happy Heart" - Lucia Pamela
2. "Rock and Roll Baby" - Eddie Murray
3. "The Future is Now" - Neil Dick
4. "Indiana" - Shooby Taylor, The Human Horn
5. "Lonesome, Lonesome George Jones" - Queenie Montgomery
6. "Hitting the Bottom" - Tony Mason-Cox
7. "First Time" - Kitty
8. "Rock & Rolling Dance" - Gordon Thomas
9. "The Cook Who Couldn't Cook" - Bingo Gazingo & Leo Abraham
10. "Boo-Bah-Bah" - Bob Vido
11. "Because We Care" - Beulah
12. "Vote for Buddy Max" - Buddy Max
13. "Settle Down" - Polly Feazel
14. "Die With Your Boots On" - Anton Maiden
15. "They Are There! (Third Take)" - Charles Ives
16. "Adele's Laughing Song" - Florence Foster Jenkins
17. "Rainy Weekend" - San D'jinn Din
18. "Wake Up America" - Sylvia Boshers
19. "The President's Prayer" - Freddie Martell
20. "I Want To Marry An Egghead" - Leona Bass
21. "Hi, Dear Mister Master Keith Richards (Intro)" - Paul "Super Apple"
22. "Apple Love" - Paul "Super Apple"
23. "Love Lives On" - Paul "Super Apple"
24. "The Chance" - Paul "Super Apple"
25. "Please Call, Keith (Outro)" - Paul "Super Apple"

=== Vol. 4 ===
1. "It Gets Better All the Time" - Shooby Taylor
2. "Star's Ghost" - Frances Cannon, The Singing Psychic
3. "I Wanna Job" - Abner Jay
4. "In the Ghetto" - Eilert Pilarm
5. "Moon Pilot" - Unknown
6. "Dock of the Bay" - Mexia State School Sunshine Singers
7. "Delightful Company" - Dana Drake
8. "Something" - Gary Strivant
9. "Michael Ferrucci" - Unknown
10. "Why Do People Try & Hurt Little Birdie" - Little Birdie
11. "Worship Me" - Amanda
12. "It Just Is" - Sri Darwin Gross
13. "I Really Don't Want to Know" - Ali Mapo & His Girls
14. "Cruise Around the Planets" - David Dynamo
15. "Hey Fireman, Put out the Fire" - Omo the Hobo
16. "Our Flag" - Tom Merlo
17. "Letter to a Christian" - Hallmark Song-Poems & Alice J. Jackson
18. "The Nightclub" - Michael O. Sullivan, The Singing Irishman
19. "Stella by Starlight" - Ivo Araujo
20. "The Garbage Can" - Bingo Gazingo
21. "Make Our Love Positive" - Martin Mechanic
22. "Genevieve, Oh My Genevieve" - "Dusty Roads" Rowe
23. "I Want a Nurse" - Jack Barrett
24. "Message to the Label Industry" - J&H Productions
25. "New York, New York" - Ken DeFeudis
