= Touchy (album) =

1974 album by Luie Luie

Studio album by Luie Luie
- Released: 1974
- Genre: Latin, funk, soul
- Label: Penstar

Touchy is a 1974 album by Luie Luie. Self-produced by the outsider musician and nightclub performer Luis Johnston, the album initially sold no more than 25 copies. Touchy was included in a list of the "101 strangest records on Spotify".

== Album ==
Touchy was an LP that was self-funded by Luie Luie. When Touchy was released in 1974, up to 25 copies were sold. The album included a "Touchy" button affixed to the sleeve of the LP. A listener could attach the button to their body, in a spot their dance partner could "pay special attention to" with a "Touchy" button of their own. Luie Luie painted the picture used for the album's cover.

Touchy is a conceptual album aimed at getting listeners into a "touchy mood". Luie later described how people were disconnected from each other and using drugs in the 1970s—"People lost contact with reality, and at that time we saw the dancers — I was playing in the nightclubs — and there was no more romance. The heart was not involved; it was movement. They lost the touch." Luie played all of the instruments used for the album, including trumpet, guitar, drums, and Moog. Each track is prefaced with a spoken word introduction by Luie. The track "Touch of Light" has Luie playing "up to 14 trumpets". His music has been described as outsider music and his voice has been compared to that of Hervé Villechaize.

Touchy was reissued in 2008 by Companion Records with a 20-page booklet. The reissue includes an additional track, "A Message from Luie Luie", in which he condemns "music pirates in Switzerland and New Jersey" who bootlegged his album without permission. Touchy was included in The Guardian's 2012 list of the "101 strangest records on Spotify", which described Luie as a "tremendously brave trumpeter".

== Luie Luie ==
Luie Luie is the stage name of Luis Johnston, a painter, screenwriter and multi-instrumentalist from Victorville, California. He released a few 45s and the album Touchy in the 1970s. From the 1970s onward he toured nightclubs and bars of the United States, playing music described as a "Mariachi-infused lounge-bar easy-listening" blend. Johnston has described himself as "The Greatest Single Act in the World".

Luie Luie and his song "El Touchy" were included in the outsider music book and compilation Songs in the Key of Z.

== Track listing ==
No.	Title	Length
1.	"El Touchy"	3:35
2.	"Tastee Touchy"	3:41
3.	"Touch Me With All Your Heart"	6:11
4.	"Tortilla Touchy"	2:43
5.	"Sweet And Tender Touchy"	4:25
6.	"Touch Of San Antone"	3:34
7.	"Lost"	3:59
8.	"Touch Of The Pharaohs"	3:46
9.	"Touch Of The Light"	5:09
10.	"Lord What A Wonderful World"	4:10
