= John Arcesi =

Arcesi
- Also known as: Don Darcy, Johnny Darcy, Arcesia
- Born: John Anthony Arcesi; February 11, 1917; Sayre, Pennsylvania, US
- Died: April 12, 1983 (aged 66) Palm Springs, California, US
- Genres: Outsider music, Crooner
- Instruments: Vocals, record producer
- Label: Capitol Records

John Anthony Arcesi (1917–1983) was an American singer of Jazz and Popular songs.

== Biography ==
=== Early life ===
Born John Anthony Arcesi (pronounced RCC) in Sayre, Pennsylvania, on February 11, 1917. John's father Antonio Arcesi (1879–1963) and mother Josephine Marchinne (1881–1919) were born in Rome, Italy. Antonio traveled alone to America at the turn of the century, leaving his wife and first-born son Ignatius behind in Italy until he could establish himself. Upon reuniting in America, Antonio and Josephine had four more children: Josephine, Loretta, Louis and Johnny. When Johnny was still a child, his father Antonio (Tony) played an Enrico Caruso disc on a Victrola and this inspired him. As a result, he became a child prodigy and local celebrity, singing whenever possible in public or private in the Sayre, Athens and Towanda area of Pennsylvania, as well as Waverly, New York, and as far as Scranton, Pennsylvania, and Elmira, New York. He turned professional at about the age of 10 after winning a talent show/contest that was produced in Sayre at the Sayre Theatre by the great 'Blackstone the Magician', Harry Blackstone, Sr., in c.1927. Blackstone paid Johnny a 5-dollar gold piece for performing and he thereby turned professional that night. Johnny sang for every club or organization in the area that wanted talent to perform for their various causes, including The Elks and The Lions. He would also sing for patients at the local Robert Packer Hospital in Sayre. In 1933, after a fire almost destroyed the family home the previous year, Johnny, at the age of 16, with his father's blessing, decided to travel alone to New York City to become a band vocalist. His childhood idols and inspirations included Russ Columbo, Bing Crosby, Red McKenzie, Enrico Caruso, Rabbi Joseph Rosenblatt and John McCormick and others.

=== Professional Career and Rise to Fame ===
Arcesi first made a name for himself as a vocalist for prominent bands in New York City. His first professional recordings on September 13, 1934, were on the Columbia label with Lud Gluskin and Orchestra. These titles were "One Night Of Love" and "Moonlight on the River Danube". His next recordings were on the Bluebird label with Louis 'King' Garcia in 1936, recording five vocals for the date: "It's Great to Be in Love Again","Christopher Columbus","Swing Mr. Charlie","There Is No Greater Love", and "Love Is Like a Cigarette". One of his first important live performances and radio broadcasts was with the Claude Hopkins Orchestra at the Roseland Ballroom in Manhattan. Hopkins let Johnny sing with the band for several nights after an impromptu audition backstage. Johnny was employed at Mills Music Publishing Company in the Brill Building as a song demonstrator and office assistant during the day, and singing in various clubs in NYC at night. Irving Mills, upon meeting Johnny during a band rehearsal with Joe Venuti in NYC, suggested the name Arcesi sounded too 'Italian'. Thus, Don Darcy was the name John used from 1935 to 1945, and he recorded as Johnny Darcy from 1946 to 1950. He was sometimes listed as Don D'Arcy. In 1935 Major Bowes, impressed by young Don when he refused to perform on his amateur show and asserted and demonstrated his professionalism at audition, gave him three sustaining (non-sponsored) 15-minute spots a week, broadcasting on WHN in NYC. Shortly thereafter Darcy was offered the same spots, thirty-minute shows, on WOR in Newark, New Jersey, where he performed from c.1935–36. During this time Darcy developed a loyal fan base of regional listeners, received fan mail and other offers, and learned about the subject of 'payola' first hand.

Upon leaving WOR, and after turning down an offer to broadcast nationally on CBS radio, Darcy desired to go on the road and learn the band business. For the next several years Darcy was the male vocalist for Joe Venuti's Orchestra c.1936–40, after having worked with Charlie Barnet, 1935, Lud Gluskin, 1934, Louis 'King' Garcia, 1936, and others. With the Venuti Orchestra, among many engagements playing the largest hotels and ballrooms in the country, Darcy opened the show for several months at Billy Rose's 'Casa Manana' extravaganza in Fort Worth, Texas, in 1936 to celebrate the 100th anniversary of Texas' statehood. Both Paul Whiteman and Joe Venuti's bands shared the stage for this event. Darcy performed the same function at Rose's Cleveland Aquacade the following year. Contrary to what has been previously written, the only association Darcy had with Rhode Island was any number of one nighters with the various bands he performed with over the next several years, i.e., Dick Gasparre, 1940, Joe Marsala, 1941–42, Sonny Dunham, 1943–44, Boyd Raeburn, 1944–45, Art Mooney, 1946–48, and Johnny Bothwell in 1948–49. Darcy also worked in brief association with the bands of Frank Trumbauer, Hal McIntyre and Sam Donahue. He recorded on various labels with these bands; labels such as Hit, Guild, Grand, Signature and Century Records. Darcy also recorded on American and Langworth Transcriptions. The Century Records dates produced four sides entitled, 'Doink, Doink', 'This Strange Desire', 'A Haunting Melody', and his first recorded version of his original song 'Noahs' Ark', a song he co-wrote with Bud Green c. 1940. The Century dates were recorded in NYC at RCA Custom studios and marked his first collaboration with Lloyd Shaffer. He later recorded 'Noah's Ark' under the title 'Rockin' the Ark'.

=== Capitol records ===
In 1952 Darcy reverted to his original birth name of John Arcesi when he signed with Capitol Records, after being heard on late night weekend broadcasts on KNX-LA with just voice and piano. Pianists Harper MacKay and Ed Greenburg accompanied Arcesi on these shows. Alan Livingston was President of the Capitol label at the time, with Lee Gillette as head of A&R. Gillette offered to have Nelson Riddle orchestrate and arrange the first recordings; however, John promised Lloyd Shaffer after recording the Century sides in NY, if and when he ever got a 'big break' that he would have Shaffer be his conductor, and he kept his promise. John recorded nine singles, with Shaffer conducting the arrangements. Shaffer had previously worked with Perry Como on the "Chesterfield Supper Club" show. John's first single release with Capitol was entitled "Wild Honey b/w "Moonlight Brings Memories", for which he received positive reviews from reviewers such as George Simon in Metronome magazine. Capitol ran several full pages ads in Billboard magazine promoting Arcesi;they felt they had another star on their hands. Arcesi also received positive reviews in Variety for his live performance work at the Thunderbird Hotel in Las Vegas in October 1952, before the notoriety of the incident written of below. Following his engagement in Las Vegas, he appeared in New York City at the French Casino, then followed with a stint at the Boulevard Cafe in Queens. He received positive reviews at these locales for his live stage work. However, he also received much derision from audiences at these shows because of the Las Vegas incident. Upon returning to Hollywood, California, after the New York engagements, Arcesi performed at the Crescendo nightclub. The opening act at these shows was the infamous Lord Buckley. In March 1953 Arcesi recorded four sides with Nelson Riddle, who arranged and conducted the date just prior to being signed to Capitol himself. The titles for this recording date: "Tombstone", "Cowpo", "Rockin' the Ark", and "Ol' Man River", the first three songs written by Arcesi. He was also voted third most promising 'new singer' by Billboard Magazine that year, following Al Martino and Steve Lawrence. His last public broadcasts with voice and guitar were on KABC-LA in 1959. These shows, broadcast on Saturday and Sunday nights were also heard over the AFRTS. On the Saturday shows, Arcesi called the broadcast 'For Adults Only', singing the standards of the day. On Sunday nights, he sang 'World of Philosophy' singing original material.

His renown eventually spread as far as the West Coast of the United States (among other places), Los Angeles and Las Vegas, Nevada. An article in the December 1, 1952, issue of Time expounds at length on a gimmick cooked up by the Arcesi's press agent, Ed Scofield, whereby the mere sound of his voice could send impressionable young women into a trance upon hearing the song "Lost in Your Love". The interview from CBS-TV on a show called "Everywhere I Go", hosted by Dan Seymour in 1952, reveals that Mr. Arcesi had nothing to do with or aforeknowledge of the stunt enacted at the Thunderbird Hotel in Las Vegas, and despite the publicity generated from the incident and Scofield himself admitting twice during the interview that Arcesi knew nothing about the stunt, it had an extremely negative effect on Arcesi's reputation and career. This interview can be viewed on the website listed below.

=== Producer ===
Sadly, the fleeting nature of fame meant Arcesi's notoriety passed almost as soon as it arrived and very little was subsequently heard from him for several years. During this time however, using the name/aliases of 'Tony Conti' and 'Chick Johnson' as a producer and songwriter he developed and recorded other artists, most notably a group called 'The Bombers', an R&B vocal quartet. With this group he wrote and produced a 9-song LP called "Songs for Strange Lovers", released on Arcesi's own Orpheus Records label in 1955. Two single 45 and 78 rpm discs were released at that time, entitled 'I'll Never Tire of You' b/w 'Malena', and 'Two Time Heart' b/w 'Sentence of Love'. Arcesi also wrote and produced a single 45 rpm disc of a female vocalist called Schartan. The titles were 'Mystery of Love' b/w 'I Need You, I Need You'. All songs written by Arcesi. After a trip to Europe in 1960, England and France and Germany, on speculation, Arcesi and his wife moved to Palm Springs, California in 1961.

In 1971, following the death of his wife the previous year, an album entitled Reachin' Arcesia was recorded in Hollywood on Cherokee Ave. at Artists Recording Studios between May 15 and July 26 of that year and released by Alpha Records in small quantity. 300 copies were pressed and released in November 1972. This LP has been 'bootlegged' by various entities, and has been erroneously released under the title 'Arcesia Reaching' with the second side as side one and the first side as side two, thereby skewing the intent of the singer and producer in presenting the songs as intended. A 45 rpm single from the LP, 'Reaching' b/w 'Pictures in My Window' was released in limited quantity in 1979 in Honolulu on the Orpheus-Alephia label, the current holders of the rights thereto. (The record was subsequently reissued without authorization in 1997 by the German label One Little Indian Records). The stark white cover of the original LP release (containing only the artist's name and album title) belied the decidedly unusual music inside. As one might expect, the leader of Arcesia was in fact the 54-year-old John Arcesi himself, who spent the better part of the 1960s devoting himself to writing, painting, songwriting and occasional rare vocal appearances at benefits in Palm Springs, California. The co-producer and engineer on the record was Alexander Furth. Furth also produced the 1968 single of 'Love Is Like A Mountain'( aka 'Reaching') b/w 'It's All Accordin'.

For the most part, the eleven songs on Reachin' Arcesia are highly emotive and passionate, with emphasis on guitar, piano and organ. The background music was unlike anything Arcesi had recorded before with orchestras. Lyrics are stream-of-consciousness musings on subjects such as life's struggle and redemption, i.e. ("Desiree"), the power of woman,("White Panther"), and life's transience ("Butterfly Mind", "Soul Wings"). Although overlooked at the time of its original issue and derided in some corners upon its re-release, the album has now gained a degree of cachet. Arcesi himself was satisfied with the outcome of the recording, knowing he had produced an original work that would take time to be understood for what it was, and still is.

=== Retrospective ===
So far, music historians have been unable to reconcile these two strikingly different phases of John Arcesi's career or to fill in the rather large gap in the above timeline. It is known that after John recorded "Reachin' Arcesia" he visited with his family in Waverly, New York, and Maryland in 1972, leaving them with copies of his final LP before returning to Palm Springs and then to Hawaii. Between 1971 and 1974 Arcesi was very successful in the Fine Arts field in Palm Springs, representing the work of Jose Montanes, Ivar, Igor, Valdez, Frank Fuller and other lesser known painters.

Arcesi lived in Honolulu, Hawaii from 1974 to 1982 where he continued to write songs and essays, draw, paint and create in his spare time. He then spent the remaining months of his life in Palm Springs, California, where he had lived during the sixties with his wife of 21 years, the late Louise Marie de Lesseps Arcesi.

== Death ==
John died in Palm Springs, California, on April 12, 1983, at the age of 66.
