= The Langley Schools Music Project =

Innocence & Despair

Live album by The Langley Schools Music Project
- Released: October 9, 2001
- Recorded: 1976–77
- Venue: School gymnasium in Langley, British Columbia
- Genre: Outsider music
- Length: 1:03:47
- Label: Bar/None Records Manimal Vinyl (2016 re-issue)

The Langley Schools Music Project is a collection of recordings of children's choruses singing pop hits by the Beach Boys, Paul McCartney, David Bowie, and others. Originally recorded in 1976–77, they were found and rereleased 25 years later (in 2001) and became a cult hit and a successful example of outsider music. It was rereleased on vinyl March 9, 2018, by Bar/None Records.

== History ==
The project was undertaken in 1976–77 by Canadian music teacher Hans Fenger with students from four different elementary schools of the Langley School District in British Columbia. Recordings were made in a school gym in Langley, in Metro Vancouver. Two LPs were released, 1976's Lochiel, Glenwood, and South Carvolth Schools and 1977's Hans Fenger/Wix-Brown Elementary School.

Fenger later said:

I knew virtually nothing about conventional music education, and didn't know how to teach singing. Above all, I knew nothing of what children's music was supposed to be. But the kids had a grasp of what they liked: emotion, drama, and making music as a group. Whether the results were good, bad, in tune or out was no big deal—they had élan. This was not the way music was traditionally taught. But then I never liked conventional 'children's music,' which is condescending and ignores the reality of children's lives, which can be dark and scary. These children hated 'cute.' They cherished songs that evoked loneliness and sadness.

The recordings were little known until Brian Linds, a Victoria record collector, found the first record in a thrift store in 2000. He sent it to Irwin Chusid, a proponent of outsider music. He arranged to have the combined two LPs released on CD by the Netherlands-based label Basta Audio-Visuals. However, according to Chusid:

When it became apparent (to me) that Basta's US distributor would not fully understand the nature of this release, I decided (with Basta's cooperation) to search for a US label to cover the North American market. The Langley project was rejected by ten labels. ... The consensus reaction from these companies indicated they didn't take these recordings seriously; several referred to them as "novelties," and observed that "no one would want to listen to this stuff a second time."

Chusid eventually arranged to have the album issued in North America on Bar/None Records. It was scheduled for release in early September, but was delayed after the 9/11 attacks on the World Trade Center. It was finally issued on 23 October 2001.

== Response ==
Professional ratings
Review scores
Source	Rating
AllMusic	4/5 stars
The Austin Chronicle	4/5 stars
Entertainment Weekly	B+
The Guardian	4/5 stars
Pitchfork	8.0/10
The Rolling Stone Album Guide	4/5 stars
The Village Voice	C−

Innocence & Despair quickly created an international buzz, making many end-of-the-year best album lists in 2001.

Fred Schneider (B-52s) called the project "a haunting, evocative wall-of-sound experience that is affecting in an incredibly visceral way". Neil Gaiman commented, "I wish every school taught music like this. I wish every piece of music recorded in a school gymnasium were this haunting... and then I suspect that, if I listened to them right, maybe they would be."

Richard Carpenter described the vocals on "Calling Occupants" as "charming". David Bowie said the version of "Space Oddity" was "a piece of art that I couldn't have conceived of", describing the vocals as "earnest if lugubrious" and the backing arrangement as "astounding".

Salon music critic Steven Hyden wrote: "[T]he gloomy title [Innocence and Despair] is no lie: The echoing, yelping renditions of this feel-good music gives off a powerfully aching melancholy. It’s the sound of youth, frozen on tape, as it fades inexorably away."

In a 2025 retrospective review in Dangerous Minds, Richard Metzger wrote, "[T]he albums were released by Bar/None Records in 2001. ... With people looking for feel-good stories after 9-11, the extraordinary bittersweet chorus of innocent young voices, along with the unlikely saga of the rediscovery of the Langley Schools Music Project, saw the CD go on to worldwide acclaim."

== Influence ==
VH-1 coordinated a reunion of Fenger and dozens of his former students in 2002, and produced a documentary about the project. Screenwriter Mike White's concept for the 2003 hit film School of Rock was inspired by the Langley CD. When Spike Jonze approached Karen O to write the soundtrack to Where The Wild Things Are, he gave Innocence and Despair as an example of the desired "simple melodies that were emotionally complex—something that both kids and adults would appreciate".

== Use in film and television ==
In 2010, the Langley School recording of "Good Vibrations" was licensed for the soundtrack of the film Catfish. It can also be heard in the film's trailer.

The song "Calling Occupants of Interplanetary Craft" was used to close the film Arabian Nights, Volume 3.

The song "Space Oddity" was used in the closing of the film Wonderstruck.

The song "Rhiannon" was used in the closing credits of the HBO series Here and Now.

The song "In My Room" was used in the episode "Au Jus" of the third season of NBC's Good Girls.

The song "Desperado" was used in the episode "bestest place on the earth" of the fourth season of HBO's Barry.

== Track listing ==
Lochiel, Glenwood, and South Carvolth Schools

Recorded and released 1976

1. You're So Good to Me (originally by The Beach Boys)
2. To Know Him Is To Love Him (The Teddy Bears)
3. Help Me, Rhonda (The Beach Boys)
4. Space Oddity (David Bowie)
5. I'm Into Something Good (Herman's Hermits)
6. Band on the Run (Paul McCartney & Wings)
7. Rhiannon (Fleetwood Mac)
8. Little Deuce Coupe (The Beach Boys)
9. Saturday Night (Bay City Rollers)

Hans Fenger/Wix-Brown Elementary School

Recorded and released 1977

1. Venus and Mars/Rock Show (originally by Paul McCartney & Wings)
2. You're Sixteen (Johnny Burnette)
3. Wildfire (Michael Martin Murphey)
4. In My Room (The Beach Boys)
5. I Get Around (The Beach Boys)
6. The Long and Winding Road (The Beatles)
7. Desperado (The Eagles)
8. Good Vibrations (The Beach Boys)
9. God Only Knows (The Beach Boys)
10. Sweet Caroline (Neil Diamond)
11. Mandy (Barry Manilow)
12. Calling Occupants of Interplanetary Craft (Klaatu)

Innocence & Despair

Compilation of the two previous albums, released 2001 in North America by Bar/None Records and in Europe by Basta Records.

1. Venus and Mars/Rock Show
2. Good Vibrations
3. God Only Knows
4. Space Oddity
5. The Long and Winding Road
6. Band on the Run
7. I'm Into Something Good
8. In My Room
9. Saturday Night
10. I Get Around
11. Mandy
12. Help Me, Rhonda
13. Desperado
14. You're So Good To Me
15. Sweet Caroline
16. To Know Him Is To Love Him
17. Rhiannon
18. You're Sixteen (Basta Records release only)
19. Little Deuce Coupe (Basta Records release only)
20. Wildfire
21. Calling Occupants of Interplanetary Craft

== See also ==
- PS22 chorus
