= Grudzień =

Grudzień is a Polish surname which means "December". Notable people with the surname include:

- Józef Grudzień (1939–2017), Polish boxer
- Peter Grudzien (1941–2013), American musician
- Piotr Grudzień (born 1991), Polish Paralympic table tennis player
