= Associated Global Systems =

Associated Global Systems (AGS) began business in 1958 operating as a domestic and international air freight forwarder. AGS was a client based, privately held 250 million dollar company. On March 29, 2012, Nippon Express U.S.A., Inc. ("NEU"; Kenryo Senda, President), a local subsidiary of Nippon Express Co., Ltd. (Kenji Watanabe, President), acquired the Associated Global Systems, Inc. ("AGS").

Founded by the former president, Norman Freeman, who initially did his own deliveries with the family station wagon. Since then AGS has expanded to over 400 offices worldwide.

It has recently expanded its operations to include home delivery services and other transportation-related areas. It is headquartered in New Hyde Park, New York, United States.

AGS is one of the highest leasers of air freight space in the world.

AGS ceased operations late 2024
