= Judson Fountain =

Judson Fountain (March 12, 1934—July 26 or 28, 2005) was an amateur actor-director who recorded a series of now-legendary "radio dramas" in the late 1960s and early 1970s, which are today hailed as a foremost example of "outsider dramatic art." He has been referred to as the "Ed Wood Jr. of Radio Drama." Fountain was born and died in New York, though the exact whereabouts are unknown.

The radio dramas were written, produced, and directed by Fountain, who also starred in them. Judson portrayed a variety of wicked witches, young thugs, elderly gangsters, and gun molls. The low-budget productions were recorded in New York at Sanders Recording Studios, and released on 12" LP records with low press runs. Fountain's main co-star was a Brooklyn-based actor named Sandor Weisberger, who also usually served as announcer for the productions. A small entourage of local actors occasionally played lead or walk-on roles.

Fountain and Weisberger were reunited in 1995 by radio station WFMU. The pair were interviewed, and they performed live (and without rehearsal) a new radio drama scripted the prior day by station listener Don Brockway. At the time of this appearance, Fountain was living in Jersey City, New Jersey.

== Themes ==
Based on the "theater of the mind" concept of pre-television era radio drama, Fountain's productions attempted to recapture the atmosphere of broadcast favorites of yesteryear such as The Shadow, Inner Sanctum, and Lights Out.

Fountain's simple, derivative plotlines often employ Halloween kitsch—spooks, witches, haunted houses—as vehicles in morality plays about redemption for the honorable and damnation for evildoers. He also appropriates elements of crime drama, featuring detectives, thieves, gunplay, and innocent victims. Characters who embody virtue are invariably rewarded, while those of criminal bent (or those who simply misbehaved) are punished, often with ghoulish glee. A few characters manage to "repent of their evil ways," but mostly, the respective dispositions are starkly fixed in black and white.

== Recordings ==
Fountain produced at least six full-length LPs. Others may exist, but a lack of source documentation and the scarcity of original copies makes this speculative. Of the known LPs, four are untitled; the other two are titled Fun in Radio and Stories in Radio.

Two compilations of Fountain's work have been released on CD by Innova Recordings, Completely in the Dark (2004) and Dark, Dark, Dark Tales (2009). Both collections were produced by outsider music authority Irwin Chusid and Barbara Economon. The cover of Dark, Dark, Dark Tales features an original portrait of Judson Fountain by noted illustrator Drew Friedman.

The first CD was acclaimed by Simpsons creator Matt Groening, who referred to Fountain's work as "brilliantly out-there outsider radio-dramas." Groening conceded the CD was "not for everybody, but I dig it!"
