= B. J. Snowden =

American songwriter and musician

BJ Snowden
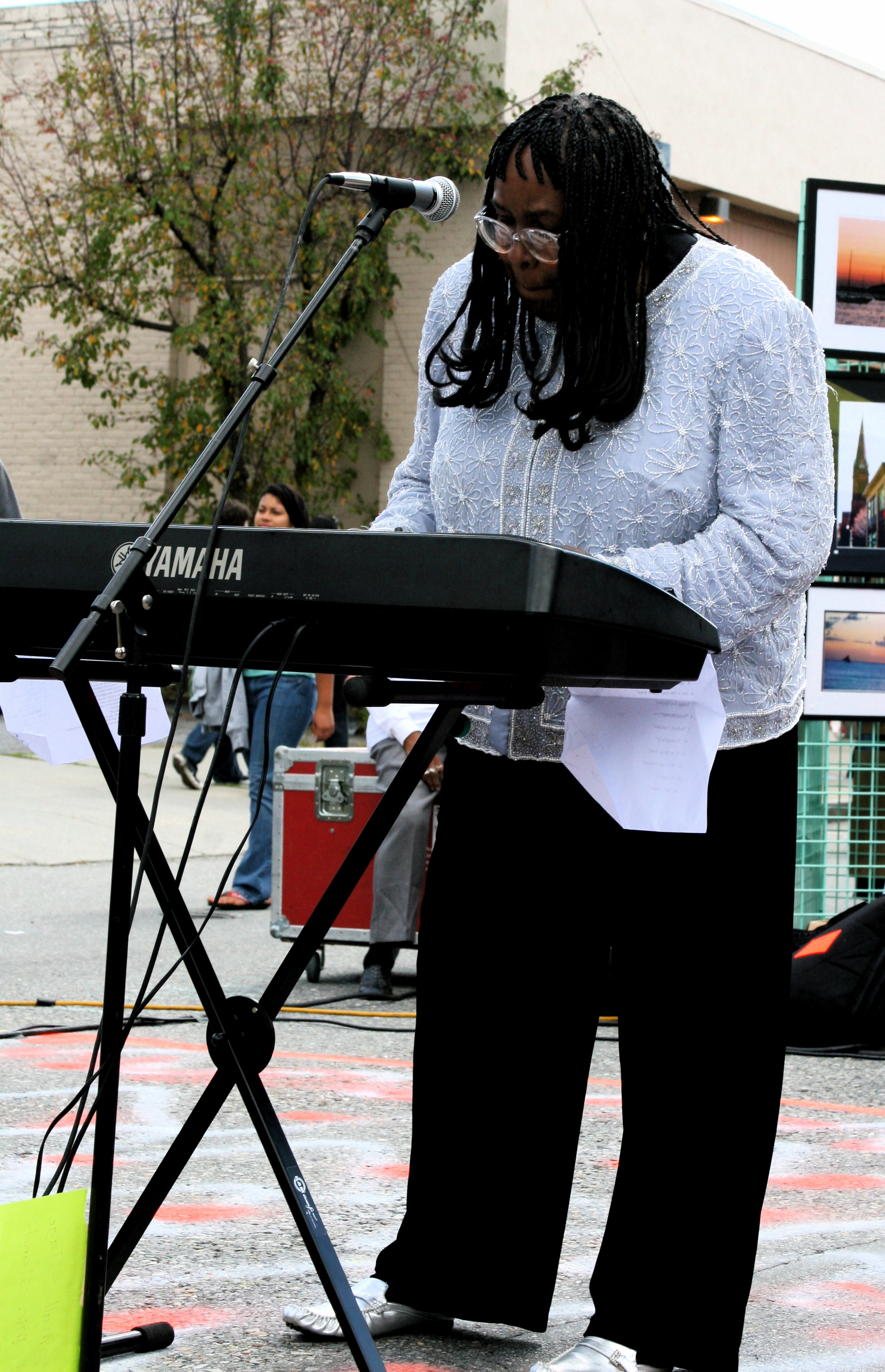

Background information
- Born: Billerica, Massachusetts, USA
- Origin: Massachusetts, USA
- Genre: Outsider music
- Occupations: Singer, songwriter, teacher

B. J. Snowden is an American songwriter and musician who sings and plays synthesizers. She has become a cult figure in Canada for her many songs about the country, including titles now covering every Canadian province, and has been featured on CBC Radio One's show As It Happens where she noted that her grandmother was Canadian, specifically she was from the are around Tracadie, Nova Scotia.. In addition to her songs about Canada, she covers diverse subjects, including Judge Joe Brown and Daisuke Matsuzaka.

Her ancestors were the first black family to purchase land in Billerica, Massachusetts, where she grew up; she graduated from Billerica Memorial High School, and later Berklee College of Music class of 1973. Snowden has taught music in Philadelphia, Boston, and Somerville, though she has been unemployed since before 2003.

Snowden's work has been referred to as outsider music. The Boston Globe has compared her to Yoko Ono and Lene Lovich. She is described by Irwin Chusid in Songs in the Key of Z: The Curious Universe of Outsider Music as having "a teddy-bearish innocence that goes over well with youngsters"; while she was initially unhappy about the "outsider music" label and coverage by Chusid, she changed her mind after subsequent mainstream press coverage. Les Inrockuptibles notes that she is one of the "famous stars of outsider music".

Her album Life in the USA and Canada, which debuted in the fall of 1996, was reviewed by David Grad in the New York Press. Her fans include Fred Schneider of the B-52's, who also produced two Christmas songs for her.

Snowden has performed on Jimmy Kimmel Live!'s Future Talent Showcase. She has also performed with Leslie and the LY's, and on The Daily Show. She was profiled on the BBC in April 2003. Snowden has also performed at the Outsider Music Festival. She performed twice on the MTV series Oddville, MTV in 1997.
