= Shooby Taylor =

American scat singer (1929–2003)

William "Shooby" Taylor

Background information
- Born: September 19, 1929; Indiana Township, Pennsylvania, U.S.
- Died: June 4, 2003 (aged 73) East Orange, New Jersey
- Genres: Scat, outsider music, jazz
- Occupation: Singer
- Instrument: Vocals
- Years active: c. 1975 – c. 1984
- Label: N/A
- Website: www.shooby.com

William "Shooby" Taylor (September 19, 1929 – June 4, 2003) was an American jazz vocalist famous for scat singing over various records, including those of the Ink Spots, the Harmonicats, Johnny Cash, Miles Davis, Mozart, and Cristy Lane, in a baritone voice.

Nicknamed "The Human Horn", he is noted for his highly idiosyncratic scat style, using sounds and syllables quite unlike those used by other scat singers.

Writing in The New York Times, Marc Ferris noted that "those who seek out music that swims against the mainstream have been entranced by [Taylor's] originality."

Music historian Irwin Chusid described Taylor as "the world's weirdest scat singer," "100 percent uninhibited and soulful, in a lovably demented way," and stated that "a joyousness permeates [his] performances, a celebratory quality that serves as an analgesic for temporary relief from existential pain."

== Biography ==
On September 19, 1929, Shooby Taylor was born in Indiana Township, Pennsylvania, a month before the Great Depression. In March of 1931, at the age of 18 months, Taylor moved to Harlem, New York City, where he spent the majority of his life. Taylor stuttered in his youth.

Circa 1946, Taylor married Sadie A.K.A. "Peaches" (last name unspecified), and at the age of 17 he had a son named William H. Taylor, Jr. The couple later divorced but remained friends until Sadie's death in the 1980s.

Taylor did not graduate high school. Circa 1947, as an 18-year-old, Taylor was drafted into the Army, and he wished to enter as a medic. However, due to his alcoholism, the army rejected him, marking him 4-F (unfit for service). Taylor overcame his alcoholism with Alcoholics Anonymous and Christian beliefs. The Selective Service System accepted Taylor when he was 23 in 1953, and he was sent to train in Augusta, Georgia for assignment to Korea.

Following his discharge in 1955, he began working as a clerk. for the U.S. Post Office. Under the G.I. Bill of Rights, Taylor began studying at the Hartnett National Music Studio on 46th Street and 8th Ave in New York; his major was saxophone and his minor was in singing. A long-time jazz fan, he claimed he heard sounds in his head and felt the need to express them. After attempting to learn the saxophone, he realized he could instead employ his voice as an instrument, declaring "I am the horn!" In his youth, Taylor visited Catholic churches, Pentecostal churches, synagogues, and mosques and enjoyed all of the religious music, claiming, "All of them had good music that was good to them and good to me."

While in school, Taylor's voice teacher warned him that scatting would ruin his voice, and he stopped immediately, but eventually returned. Taylor performed at Harlem clubs and in Greenwich Village jam sessions, emulating the vocal style of Babs Gonzales; Gonzalez was Taylor's idol as a teenager.

He claimed to have gotten permission from Dizzy Gillespie to use the nickname "Shooby;" when he met Gillespie in a lobby in the 1970s and asked for permission, Gillespie stated, "Yeah, go ahead, guy! Go ahead!" Taylor adopted the moniker "Shooby Taylor, The Human Horn."

In 2002, he described his days working as a clerk at the Post Office:

I used to work from 4 to 12 so I can get off work and work the clubs...because I tried to make a name for myself. I would go to jam session nights, you see. I was unknown, trying to get my name known.

In the 1970s, he suffered a workplace injury and retired from the Post Office. Taylor's pension allowed him to devote his time to music, making numerous home recordings. Circa 1983, Taylor paid multiple visits to Angel Sound Studios in Times Square, where he recorded a number of tracks, and where he came to the attention of studio engineer Craig Bradley, who recalled "I was attuned to the unusual... Shooby was an exciting character, someone you were drawn to right away." In 1987, Taylor briefly appeared on the show It's Showtime at the Apollo, but was booed off the stage after roughly twenty seconds. This may be the only remaining video of his performances. In 2002, when asked to recall the event, Taylor recalled:

I was hurt, very hurt because I got booed off...And then I figured, "Oh, I did it wrong." But after months and months of thinking about it, I said, "I did it the way how I wanted to do it!"

Bradley later transferred the Angel Sound Studios tracks to cassette and sent copies to WFMU manager Ken Freedman, who, with Irwin Chusid, began broadcasting and circulating them, leading to a growing cult following for Taylor and "generating a frothing fan base." Taylor, however, was unaware of the publicity, and his fans were unaware of his whereabouts. In 1992, Taylor moved to a senior complex in Newark, New Jersey.

In 1993, Taylor's last public performance was in a bar on West 23rd Street. The following year, he experienced a stroke that impaired his ability to scat, preventing him from recording and performing. In 1995, he was invited to be a guest on the Late Show with David Letterman, but declined because he was still recovering from his stroke.

In 2000, two of Taylor's songs, covers of "Stout-Hearted Men" and "Lift Every Voice and Sing", were released as part of the outsider music compilation album Songs in the Key of Z, leading to further recognition.

In July 2002, Elektra Records executive and Taylor fan Rick Goetz managed to track Taylor down by cold-calling every person named William Taylor in the New York area, and finally was able to contact his son, William H. Taylor, Jr.

On August 28, 2002, Shooby appeared for a radio interview on WFMU, leading to further publicity. Following the broadcast, Goetz and Chusid transferred a number of Taylor's home recordings to CD-R to preserve some of his legacy. In September of that year, WFMU staff delivered birthday greetings to Taylor from fans around the world.

As of 2002, he continued to attend church regularly; his Newark nursing home held a service every Sunday and Tuesday night.

Taylor died on June 4, 2003, at the VA Hospital in East Orange, New Jersey, at the age of 73.

At the end of posthumous album Shooby Taylor: The Human Horn (Side Two), after Taylor's cover of "Over the Rainbow," he briefly addresses his audience:

Okay, I hope you enjoyed the tunes that I've done by the great artists. "Let everything that hath breath praise the Lord. Praise-ye the Lord." I've given you maybe not what you want, but hopefully what you need. The end. Shooby Taylor.

== Style and reception ==
In 2000, Irwin Chusid wrote that Taylor's scatting "echoes Mother Goose nonsense simmering in a rich Afro-Yiddish stew." According to Chusid, "Shooby's vocabulary is a whole 'nuther language. Some of his favorite scat syllables are 'Raw-shaw,' 'poppy-poppy,' and 'splaw,' sputtered in a virile baritone vaguely reminiscent of Dudley Do-Right, the chaos-prone Canadian Mountie," and "his lung capacity is staggering; he never pauses long enough to inhale as he spews out astonishing high-octane vocal runs."

Circa 2000, singer Joe Henry described Taylor's singing as "a cross between scat singing and speaking in tongues," stating that it was "unlike anything I've ever heard in my life. A lot of people who hear it think of it like a novelty, but I hear it as a man who's completely come out of a vacuum and developed an approach to music that's as unique as Charlie Parker... I can't stop listening to it. It's so full of a kind of passion that I can't even begin to describe."

In 2002, Marc Ferris wrote that Taylor's music can be "difficult to digest. As he tries to approximate the sound of a saxophone solo with his voice, he hits sour notes. He spits out nonsense syllables like a machine gun, communicating in a private language nearly impossible to imitate. And he rarely meshes with his background music."

In 2020, Allmusic reviewer Jason Ankeny described his music as "singular and eccentric... equal parts nonsense words, off-tempo vocalese, and saxophone-inspired squawks."

While scatting, Taylor would frequently mime playing an "air" saxophone. Craig Bradley recalled that all of Taylor's recordings were first takes: "I think he was just winging it, improvising. So even if we did a second take, it wouldn't be to fix mistakes, it would just be a different version. But he was happy with his performance every time." An example is his two versions of "Over the Rainbow;" one with a band sound and other with piano accompaniment, both with completely different melodies.

== Legacy ==
During the 1990s, UK TV series Adam and Joe Show used the first 4 seconds of Taylor's version of "Lift Every Voice and Sing", at the start of their theme tune.

In the 2000 song "Walk & Chew Gum" by the band Optiganally Yours, there is a mention of "Shooby Taylor" in the last line of their scat-like bridge.

In 2005, Taylor made a posthumous appearance on a split 7-inch EP by Xiu Xiu and The Dead Science.

In the 2016 Illumination Entertainment animated film Sing, a recording of Taylor's rendition of "Stout-Hearted Man" is used for a hippopotamus's audition.

In 2017, a posthumous compilation of Taylor's work, entitled The Human Horn, was digitally released under the Songs in the Key of Z label. Dozens of these songs were not published during his lifetime. The label also distributes the Songs in the Key of Z compilation records.

In 2019, Taylor was the subject of a BBC Radio 4 broadcast by Adam Buxton.

Circa 2000, musicians Tom Waits and Marshall Crenshaw described themselves as fans of Taylor's music, with Crenshaw proclaiming Taylor "The King of Farfisa-Wielding, Outer-Space, Lunatic-Fringe Scat Singers."

== Discography ==
- Ink Spots - You Were Only Foolin' / Miles Davis - The Theme / Wolfgang Mozart - Rondeau, Allegretto (cassette)
- Blowing My Mind (1970, Shooby Records, 45 RPM vinyl)
- Expressing Myself (parts 1 & 2) as "Shooby Taylor the Human Instrument" (January 1971, Shooby Records)
- The Human Horn (and then some) - Dexter Gordon / Coltrane / Elvis (1980s, cassette)
- The Human Horn (and then some) - Johnny Cash (1980s, cassette)
- The Human Horn (and then some) - Country & Jazz (1980s, cassette)
- The Human Horn (2001, WFMU, cassette/MP3)
- The Human Horn (Side One) (2017, Apple Music)
- The Human Horn (Side Two) (2017, Apple Music)
