= Katerina Katakalides =

American model and beauty pageant titleholder

- Born: May 8, 1998 (age 28); New Hyde Park, New York
- Education: Dominican Academy Carleton College
- Height: 1.7 m (5 ft 7 in)
- Beauty pageant titleholder
- Title: United States of America’s Miss New Jersey 2022; Miss Grand Minnesota 2019; Teen Miss New York 2016
- Agency: Bicoastal MGMT (Former)
- Hair color: Red
- Eye color: Green
- Major competitions: United States of America’s Miss 2022; Miss Grand United States 2019; Miss Supranational USA 2019; Teen Miss Earth United States 2016; Miss American Teen 2016

Katerina Ana Katakalides (born May 8, 1998) is an American model and beauty pageant titleholder who won the Teen Miss New York competition in 2016. She represented New York at Teen Miss Earth United States 2016. She was placed in the Top 6 at the United States of America's Miss pageant.

== Early life ==
Katakalides was born in New Hyde Park, New York, on May 8, 1998, and is of Greek and Ecuadorian descent. She grew up in Whitestone, Queens, and attended Dominican Academy. She later moved to Minnesota in order to attend Carleton College and graduated with a bachelor's degree in Sociology and Anthropology, with minors in Africana Studies, Educational Studies, and Public Policy.

== Pageantry ==
=== Miss American Teen 2016 ===
In November 2015, Katakalides represented New York at the Miss American Teen pageant under the title Miss Empire State. While at this pageant, hosted in Orlando, Florida, she won the Academic Achievement award.

=== Teen Miss Earth United States 2016 ===
Katakalides represented New York at Teen Miss Earth United States 2016 in Washington, D.C., where she placed in the Top 15.

=== Miss Teen Minnesota United States 2018 ===
Katakalides competed at the 2018 Miss Teen Minnesota United States pageant as Miss Teen Minneapolis.

=== Miss Grand United States 2019 ===
In August 2019, Katakalides won the title of Miss Grand Minnesota, allowing her to progress to the 2019 Miss Grand United States pageant, an official preliminary for Miss Grand International.

=== Miss Supranational USA 2019 ===
In August 2019, Katakalides represented Minnesota at Miss Supranational USA pageant, an official preliminary for Miss Supranational. During the pageant finale, Katakalides won the Miss Photogenic award.

=== Princess of America 2020 ===
In May 2020, Katakalides was crowned Princess of America Miss Minnesota 2020.

=== United States of America’s New Jersey 2022 ===
In October 2021, Katakalides was crowned United States of America’s Miss New Jersey. She then competed at the national United States of America's Miss pageant in Las Vegas, Nevada. During the finale, Katakalides placed in the Top 6.

=== Miss Earth USA 2023 ===
In August 2023, Katakalides was announced as Minnesota’s representative at Miss Earth USA 2024. On December 31, 2023, she will compete for the opportunity to represent the USA at Miss Earth, one of the Big Four International beauty pageants.

== Modeling ==
=== Publications ===
Katakalides was featured in a six page winter editorial spread in Beauty Mute Magazine, a European fashion and culture magazine. Katakalides was later featured in another issue of Beauty Mute Magazine with an eight page editorial spread titled "Beauty of Light". In December 2020, Katakalides was featured in a four page spread in VZSN Magazine.

=== Runway ===
Katakalides walked in the SS19 collection New York Fashion Week shows for designers Kenny Kas, Caren K and Mashil Alghamdi.

=== Catalogue ===
Katakalides modeled the deli collection for clothing company Figura and is featured on their website.

== Academia ==
In April 2019, Katakalides was announced as a recipient of a Summer Research Partner award from the Humanities Center at Carleton College. Along with Dr. Charisse Burden-Stelly, Katakalides completed archival research for a book project, The Radical Horizon of Black Betrayal: Antiradicalism, Antiblackness, and the U.S. Capitalist State.

As of June 2020, Katakalides' senior thesis, "Navigating Global Beauty Standards: Natural Hair and National Representation," is available online.
