= Peter Grudzien =

American singer-songwriter

- Born: 1941
- Died: 2013 (aged 71–72)
- Occupations: commercial artist; musician; photographer; singer-songwriter

Peter Grudzien (1941 – 2013) was an American country/psychedelic singer-songwriter, photographer, commercial artist, musician and recording engineer. Grudzien's music has been well known in the outsider music community since its inclusion in Irwin Chusid's book Songs in the Key of Z: The Curious Universe of Outsider Music (2000). "There's a Star Spangled Banner Waving Somewhere" is included on the companion CD for the book.

Grudzien grew up listening to classical music and later discovered country. In the 1950s he started listening to Hank Williams, Lefty Frizzell, Johnny Horton, and similar artists. Peter had a recording contract at the age of sixteen with the Pell Brothers, whom he called "Brooklyn hillbillies". They wrote the music; he wrote the lyrics.

Grudzien and his twin sister Theresa Lewis (died c. 2005–07) were paranoid schizophrenics. Grudzien was a patient at Creedmoor Psychiatric Center for eight months in the 1960s, where he received electroconvulsive therapy.

He was tremendously influenced by Johnny Cash, whom he met briefly. Although he had his picture taken with Cash, they did not otherwise meet and never played together. In the 1960s and '70s, Grudzien was active in the Greenwich Village folk/bluegrass scene, which included artists such as John Herald, Peter Stampfel, and Phil White.

Grudzien's LP The Unicorn was released in 1974. Grudzien had 500 copies pressed and tried, unsuccessfully, to sell them in bookstores. The album was almost entirely written, played, and produced by Grudzien except for the piano intro in "The Innocents", transcribed by a friend whose name he has forgotten. The Unicorn was re-released on CD by Parallel World in 1995. The CD release of The Unicorn also included several new songs by Grudzien, including his take on the American standard "There's a Star Spangled Banner Waving Somewhere" updated with many openly gay sentiments.

According to Grudzien's associate Barbara Zigman, Grudzien did not receive any royalties from Parallel World for the CD reissue. According to the label owners, the CD never sold enough to recoup the reproduction costs (which were very high because of the poor condition of the master tapes), and as per the lease agreement, was not required to dispense any royalties until such costs were recouped. An advance had been offered, which Grudzien turned down.

Late in his life, Grudzien still occasionally performed in the New York area. He recorded extensively, mostly for friends. Several post-Unicorn tapes and CDs were released but are not generally available. However, he released a cover of Malvina Reynolds's "Little Boxes" for Bob Koenig's Abbey Lane CD.

In 2018, a documentary about Peter and his family, The Unicorn, was released. According to directors Isabelle DuPuis and Tim Geraghty, Grudzien's friends are trying to release some of his later music.
