= Eilert Pilarm =

Swedish Elvis impersonator

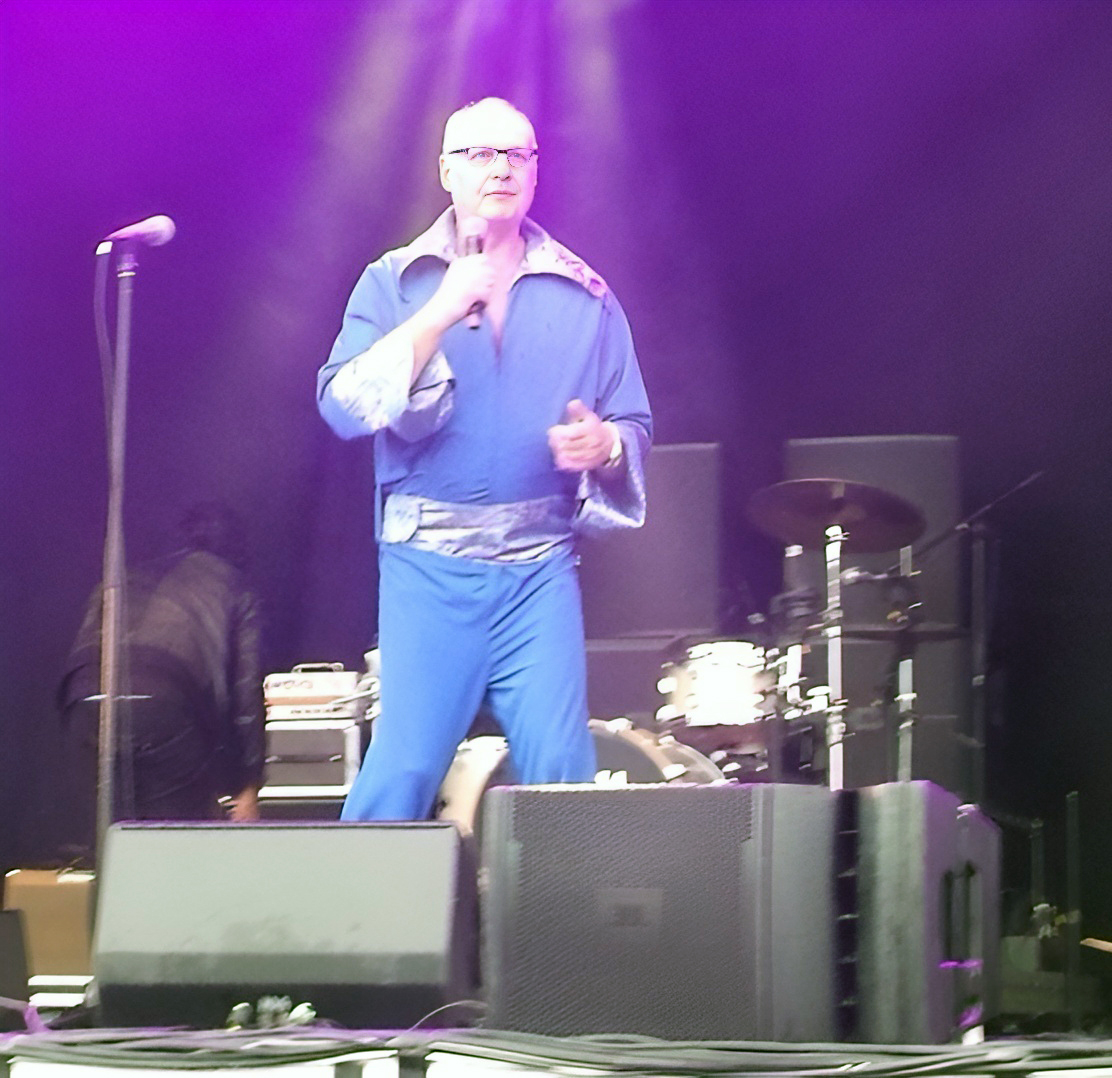
- Eilert Pilarm performing in 2014

Background information
- Birth name: Eilert Dahlberg
- Born: 2 April 1953 (age 72); Anundsjö, Sweden
- Occupation: Elvis impersonator
- Years active: 1992–2003
- Labels: MCA

Eilert Dahlberg (born 2 April 1953 in Anundsjö, Sweden), who uses the stage name Eilert Pilarm, is a Swedish former Elvis impersonator. He gained fame when he performed on Morgonpasset on Sveriges Radio in 1992, but retired from music in 2003.

== Career ==
Pilarm self-released several cassettes before his debut CD Greatest Hits was released in 1996 on MCA. Eilert is Back! followed in 1998 and Live in Stockholm appeared in 2000. He stopped performing in 2002 after 600 gigs and six albums.

Pilarm is one of several musicians featured in Irwin Chusid's book Songs in the Key of Z, which focuses on outsider music and hip hop.

His album Eilerts Jul ("Eilert's Christmas") frequently appears in internet lists of "worst album covers of all time".

He used to own a Royal Enfield motorbike, but has since sold it, and at present it resides in Tavelsjö.
