= Chicago (That Toddlin' Town) =

Song written and composed by Fred Fisher

Single by Frank Sinatra
- A-side: "All the Way"
- Released: October 1957
- Recorded: 1957
- Genre: Vocal jazz, swing, traditional pop
- Length: 2:10
- Label: Capitol Records
- Songwriter: Fred Fisher
- Producer: Nelson Riddle

Frank Sinatra singles chronology
"You're Cheatin' Yourself (If You're Cheatin' on Me)" (1957)	"Chicago" (1957)	"Witchcraft" (1958)

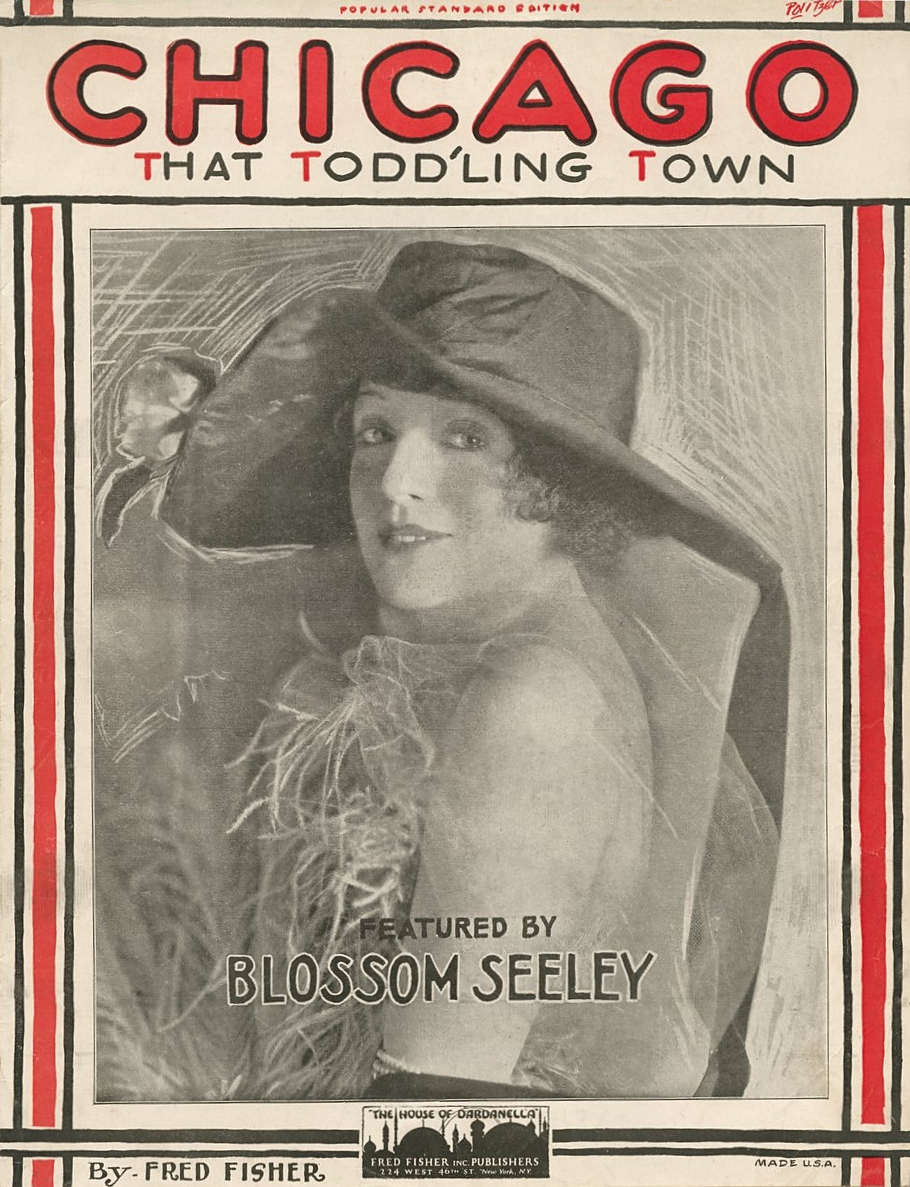
Sheet music for "Chicago" featuring Blossom Seeley (1922)

"Chicago"

Single by Sergio Franchi
- Released: 1964
- Label: RCA Victor
- Songwriter: Fred Fisher
- RCA Victor release number 47-8315

"Chicago" is a popular song written by Fred Fisher and published in 1922 by Fred Fisher. The original sheet music variously spelled the title "Todd'ling" or "Toddling." The song has been recorded by many artists, but the best-known versions are by Frank Sinatra, Ben Selvin and Judy Garland. The song alludes to the city's colorful past, feigning "... the surprise of my life / I saw a man dancing with his own wife", mentioning evangelist Billy Sunday as having not been able to "shut down" the city, and State Street where "they do things they don't do on Broadway".

The song made a minor appearance on the U.S. pop charts, reaching #84 in the fall of 1957. It was the first of two charting songs about Chicago recorded by Sinatra. The other was "My Kind of Town" from 1964, which reached U.S. #110.

This song was parodied in 1996 as "Chicago (No Elmos Allowed)" as a satirical commentary on the mass-commercialization of Elmo, as that was when he was at the peak of pop culture saturation with Elmo themed merchandise and Tickle-Me Elmo dolls.

== Lyrics ==
As with many similar songs, the lyrics have undergone a number of reworkings. The original third verse included the lines, "More Colored people up in State Street you can see,/ Than you'll see in Louisiana or Tennessee" and makes reference to the Chicago Stockyards. Later recordings have a number of replacements: Of all versions, Judy Garland's 1961 Judy at Carnegie Hall concert recording contains more references than most: Marshall Field's department store, the Drake Hotel, the Chicago Loop, The Pump Room at the Ambassador East hotel, and even Mrs O'Leary's Cow.

== Chart history ==
Chart (1957)	Peak position
UK Singles Chart (OCC)	21
U.S. Billboard Hot 100	84
U.S. Cash Box Top 100	45

== Film appearances ==
- 1937 - Instrumental version played over opening credits of 1933 film, Little Giant with Edward G. Robinson; also reprised later in the film.
- 1939 - featured in H.C. Potter's 1939 film, The Story of Vernon and Irene Castle, starring Ginger Rogers and Fred Astaire.
- 1942 - the song was featured in the opening and closing credits of the 1942 movie Roxie Hart starring Ginger Rogers and Adolphe Menjou.
- 1949 - included in the fictionalized biography of Fred Fisher, Oh, You Beautiful Doll.
- 1952 - used in the 1952 film With a Song in My Heart.
- 1957 - performed by Frank Sinatra in a 1957 movie in which he starred, The Joker Is Wild. His separately-recorded rendition (i.e., not the same version that is in the film) is the only charting version of the song.
- 1974 - appears in the film Harry and Tonto.

== Recorded versions ==
- Synco Jazz Band (Joseph Samuels) (Aug 10, 1922)
- Ben Selvin
- Jamey Aebersold
- Ann-Margret
- George Barnes
- Luis Barreiro
- Count Basie
- Laura Benanti - The Playboy Club
- Tony Bennett
- Pierre Blanchard
- Claude Bolling
- Boston Pops Orchestra
- James Brown
- Dave Brubeck
- John Bunch
- Benny Carter
- Chicago - Night and Day: Big-Band (1995)
- Rosemary Clooney
- Bing Crosby for his 1957 album New Tricks.
- Graham Dalby & the Grahamophones
- Sammy Davis Jr.
- Jimmy Dorsey
- Tommy Dorsey
- John Eaton
- Duke Ellington
- Bob Florence
- Pete Fountain
- Sergio Franchi (in Italian) on his 1964 RCA single
- Bud Freeman
- Jackie and Roy
- Judy Garland on her double LP Judy at Carnegie Hall (1961) and the studio album Judy in London (1972, rec. 1960)
- The Georgians (1922)
- Harry Goldson
- Nat Gonella & His Georgians (unrelated to the 1922 Georgians)
- Benny Goodman
- Stéphane Grappelli
- Coleman Hawkins
- Earl Hines
- Mimi Hines
- Franz Jackson
- Milt Jackson
- Jazzbo's Carolina Serenaders
- Jive Bunny & the Mastermixers
- Al Jolson
- Greetje Kauffeld
- François Laudet
- Lead Belly
- Joe Lovano
- Billy May
- Dudley Moore
- Jaye P. Morgan
- Jack Mudurian
- Bill O'Connell
- Anita O'Day
- Original Piano Trio
- Oscar Peterson
- Louis Prima
- Quintet of the Hot Club of France
- Lou Rawls
- Django Reinhardt
- Buddy Rich
- Tony Sandler
- Bob Scobey
- The Sentimental Strings
- John Serry Sr. and his ensemble (See RCA Thesaurus).
- Screeching Weasel
- Ray Sherman
- Victor Silvester
- Frank Sinatra - Come Fly with Me (1958)
- Muggsy Spanier
- The Starlite Orchestra
- Wally Stott and his Orchestra
- Barbara Sutton Curtis
- George Holmes Tate
- Gary Tesca
- Rufus Wainwright - Rufus Does Judy at Carnegie Hall (2007)
- Paul Whiteman and His Orchestra
- World's Greatest Jazz Band
- Wurlitzer Band Organ
- Wurlitzer Model 165 Band Organ
- Penn Glee Club
- George Scott Wood's Six Swingers

== Live covers ==
- Green Day during a concert at Chicago's United Center on July 13, 2009
- Sergio Franchi recorded this song in Italian during his concert in 1965 for RCA Victor, Live at The Coconut Grove
- CM Punk at the end of the 27 June 2011 edition of Monday Night Raw
