= King Garcia =

Puerto Rican jazz trumpeter

Louis "King" Garcia (August 25, 1905 – September 4, 1983) was a Puerto Rican jazz trumpeter who spent most of his career in the United States.

Garcia played early in his life in the Municipal Band of San Juan, whose director was Juan Tizol's uncle, Manuel Tizol. He moved to the U.S. early in the 1920s, where he played with the Original Dixieland Jazz Band and Emil Coleman. In the 1930s he did work in the studios, including his most important association, which was with Jimmy and Tommy Dorsey. He recorded with the bandleaders both together and separately. He also played with Vic Berton (1935), Richard Himber, Nat Brandwyne, Amanda Randolph, and Louis Prima (1939). In the 1940s he returned to play with Coleman again, and led his own Latin ensemble that decade. By the 1960s he had moved to California and essentially retired due to failing health.

== See also ==
- Eugene Chadbourne
