= New Hyde Park, New York =

- Village
- Incorporated Village of New Hyde Park
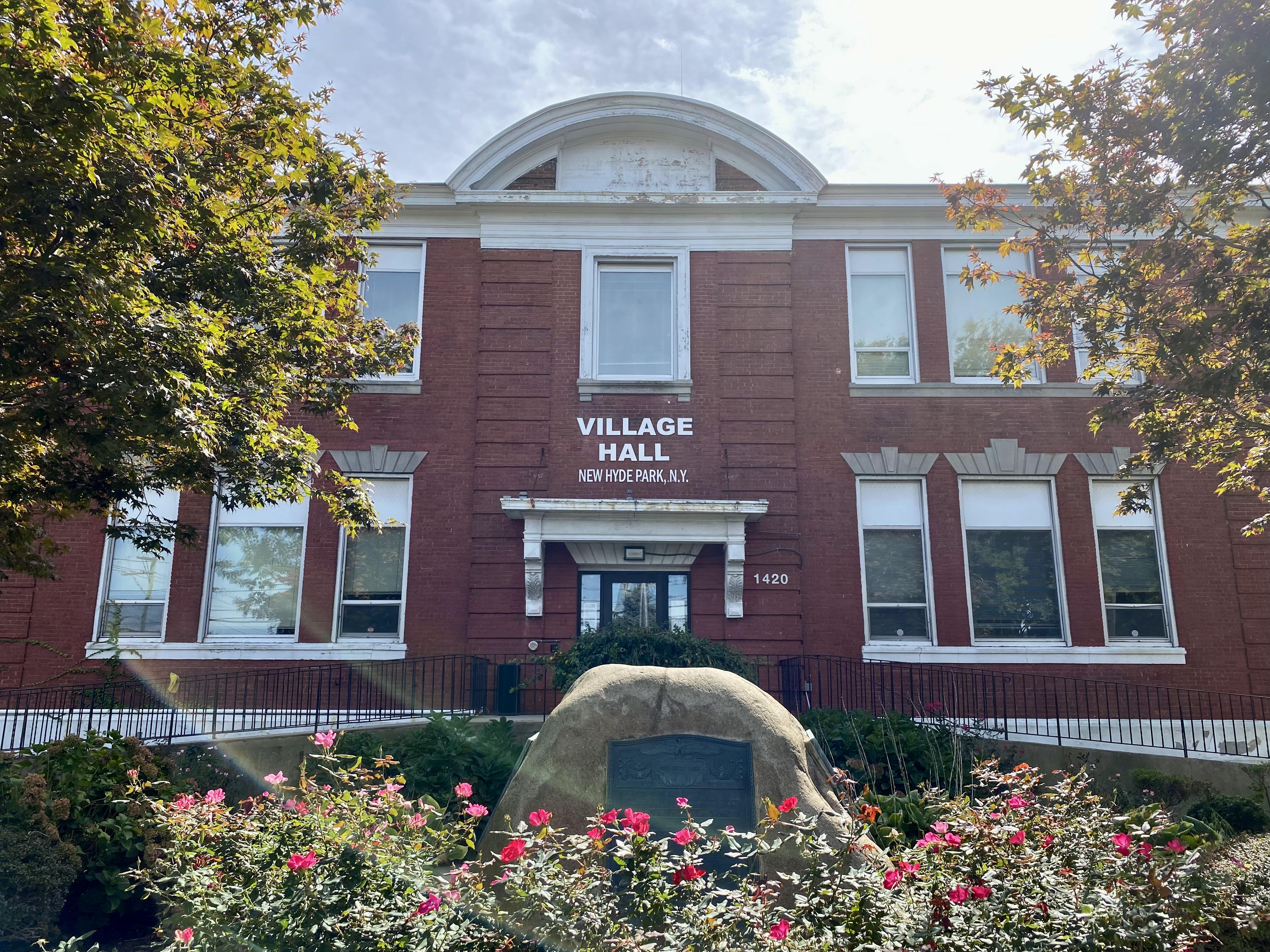
- New Hyde Park Village Hall in 2021
- Motto: "A Great Place to Live"
- Location in Nassau County and the state of New York

- Location on Long Island Location within the state of New York
- Coordinates: 40°43′56″N 73°41′5″W
- Country: United States
- State: New York
- County: Nassau
- Towns: Hempstead; North Hempstead
- Incorporated: 1927
- Named after: Ann Hyde

Government
  - Mayor: Christopher Devane
  - Deputy Mayor: Madhvi Nijjar

Area
  - Total: 0.85 sq mi (2.20 km^{2})
  - Land: 0.85 sq mi (2.20 km^{2})
  - Water: 0 sq mi (0.00 km^{2})
- Elevation: 105 ft (32 m)

Population (2020)
  - Total: 10,257
  - Density: 12,099.0/sq mi (4,671.46/km^{2})
- Time zone: UTC-5 (Eastern)
  - Summer (DST): UTC-4 (Eastern)
- ZIP Code: 11040
- Area codes: 516, 363
- FIPS code: 36-50397
- GNIS feature ID: 0958423
- Website: villagenhpny.gov

New Hyde Park is a village within the Towns of Hempstead and North Hempstead in Nassau County, on Long Island, in New York, United States. It is the anchor community of the Greater New Hyde Park area. The population was 10,257 at the time of the 2020 census.

== History ==
Thomas Dongan, the fourth royal governor of New York, was granted an 800-acre parcel of land in 1683 that included New Hyde Park. It was known as "Dongan's Farm." Dongan built a mansion on what is now Lakeville Road. In 1691, Dongan fled to New England and then Ireland, as King James II and his Catholic forces failed to regain power in England and Ireland.

In 1715, Dongan's estate was sold to George Clarke (who was Secretary of the Province of New York). He named it Hyde Park in honor of his wife, Ann Hyde. Clarke sold the property in 1783 and in the early 19th century it was parceled up and sold as farm land. Raising cattle was a chief agricultural enterprise from Dongan's time until the mid-19th century, when cattle farming in the expanding American West forced the farmers into other pursuits.

When a local post office opened in 1871, the name was changed from Hyde Park to New Hyde Park to avoid confusion with the Town of Hyde Park in the Hudson Valley.

The village was incorporated in 1927, after the majority of residents voted in favor of doing so. The northern, unincorporated part of New Hyde Park was home to several notable events: Shelter Rock, deposited during the last glacial period and marking the southern extent of that event; in 1908, the Vanderbilt Motor Parkway (later known as the Old Motor Parkway), the first limited access highway in the world and used for auto racing; from 1946 to 1947, home to the United Nations at the Sperry Gyroscope building on Marcus Avenue.

== Geography ==
According to the United States Census Bureau, the village has a total area of 0.8 square miles (2.1 km^{2}), all land.

New Hyde Park lies in the towns of Hempstead and North Hempstead in Nassau County.

Referred to by residents as New Hyde Park, the census-designated place (CDP) of North New Hyde Park also lies in North Hempstead. It also uses the New Hyde Park postal code, 11040.

New Hyde Park borders the villages of Floral Park, Stewart Manor, Garden City Park, and Garden City.

=== Greater New Hyde Park ===
In addition to the Village of New Hyde Park, the New Hyde Park 11040 zip code includes unincorporated New Hyde Park, North New Hyde Park, Garden City Park, Herricks, Manhasset Hills and Lakeville Estates – all unincorporated areas of the Town of North Hempstead in Nassau County. In addition, a small section of the New Hyde Park postal zone extends into the village of North Hills, also in Nassau County. Finally, a small area of Queens called Glen Oaks is provided mail service by the New Hyde Park 11040 post office.

The Village of New Hyde Park is patrolled by the Nassau County Police Department.

The New Hyde Park Fire District, Garden City Park Water and Fire District, and Manhasset-Lakeville Fire District provide fire protection for various portions of the New Hyde Park 11040 postal zone located in Nassau County.

== Economy ==
Because of its close proximity and relatively short commute to Manhattan, it is primarily a commuter village with over 75% of the land used for single family residences, but also has warehouses near the Long Island Rail Road station and retail districts along Jericho Turnpike. Northwell Health, the largest employer on Long Island, is headquartered in North New Hyde Park, just outside the village's corporate limits.

Prior to gentrification, New Hyde Park had previously been home to more industrial companies including Techem, Inc., which manufactured acid-based chromium, cadmium, cyanide, nickel, and zinc electroplating solutions from 1973 to 1994. Stock Drive Products and Sterling Instrument machine and manufacture more than 130,000 kinds of mechanical components. Customers include Boeing Satellite Systems, Hamilton Sundstrand, Raytheon Systems, FLIR Systems, and Israel Aerospace. The companies are owned by Designatronics Inc.

== Demographics ==
Historical population
Census	Pop.	Note	%±
1930	3,314		—
1940	4,691		41.6%
1950	7,349		56.7%
1960	10,808		47.1%
1970	10,116		−6.4%
1980	9,801		−3.1%
1990	9,728		−0.7%
2000	9,523		−2.1%
2010	9,712		2.0%
2020	10,257		5.6%
U.S. Decennial Census

=== Racial and ethnic composition ===
New Hyde Park village, New York – Racial and ethnic composition Note: the US Census treats Hispanic/Latino as an ethnic category. This table excludes Latinos from the racial categories and assigns them to a separate category. Hispanics/Latinos may be of any race.
Race / Ethnicity (NH = Non-Hispanic)	Pop 2000	Pop 2010	Pop 2020	% 2000	% 2010	% 2020
White alone (NH)	7,321	5,642	4,253	76.88%	58.09%	41.46%
Black or African American alone (NH)	52	104	176	0.55%	1.07%	1.72%
Native American or Alaska Native alone (NH)	6	22	29	0.06%	0.23%	0.28%
Asian alone (NH)	1,268	2,521	4,063	13.32%	25.96%	39.61%
Native Hawaiian or Pacific Islander alone (NH)	1	4	4	0.01%	0.04%	0.04%
Other race alone (NH)	27	65	85	0.28%	0.67%	0.83%
Mixed race or Multiracial (NH)	92	170	234	0.97%	1.75%	2.28%
Hispanic or Latino (any race)	756	1,184	1,413	7.94%	12.19%	13.78%
Total	9,523	9,712	10,257	100.00%	100.00%	100.00%

=== 2020 census ===
As of the 2020 census, New Hyde Park had a population of 10,257. The median age was 43.2 years. 20.4% of residents were under the age of 18 and 18.0% of residents were 65 years of age or older. For every 100 females there were 92.9 males, and for every 100 females age 18 and over there were 90.8 males age 18 and over.

100.0% of residents lived in urban areas, while 0.0% lived in rural areas.

There were 3,260 households in New Hyde Park, of which 38.2% had children under the age of 18 living in them. Of all households, 65.5% were married-couple households, 11.5% were households with a male householder and no spouse or partner present, and 20.4% were households with a female householder and no spouse or partner present. About 14.6% of all households were made up of individuals and 8.3% had someone living alone who was 65 years of age or older.

There were 3,376 housing units, of which 3.4% were vacant. The homeowner vacancy rate was 0.9% and the rental vacancy rate was 2.5%.

=== 2010 census ===
As of the census of 2010, there were 9,712 people, 3,290 households, and 2,569 families living in the village. The population density was 11,281.8 inhabitants per square mile (4,355.9/km^{2}). There were 3,353 housing units at an average density of 3,972.3 per square mile (1,533.7/km^{2}). The racial makeup of the village was 58.1% Non-Hispanic White, 1.3% African American, 0.3% Native American, 26.0% Asian, 0.1% Pacific Islander, 2.5% from other races, and 2.5% from two or more races. Hispanic or Latino of any race were 12.2% of the population.

There were 3,290 households, out of which 32.7% had children under the age of 18 living with them, 63.0% were married couples living together, 10.9% had a female householder with no husband present, and 21.9% were non-families. 18.5% of all households were made up of individuals, and 10.5% had someone living alone who was 65 years of age or older. The average household size was 2.89 and the average family size was 3.31.

In the village, the population was spread out, with 22.1% under the age of 18, 7.4% from 18 to 24, 28.5% from 25 to 44, 23.8% from 45 to 64, and 18.1% who were 65 years of age or older. The median age was 40 years. For every 100 females, there were 90.5 males. For every 100 females age 18 and over, there were 88.9 males.

The median income for a household in the village was $89,524, and the median income for a family was $97,656. Nonfamily households had a median income of $55,313.

About 2.4% of families and 3.3% of the population were below the poverty line, including 1.9% of those under age 18 and 6.1% of those age 65 or over.

=== 2000 census ===
Per the census of 2000, there were 9,523 people, 3,290 households, and 2,569 families living in the village. The population density was 11,281.8 inhabitants per square mile (4,355.9/km^{2}). There were 3,353 housing units at an average density of 3,972.3 per square mile (1,533.7/km^{2}). The racial makeup of the village was 82.01% White, 0.57% African American, 0.07% Native American, 13.40% Asian, 0.02% Pacific Islander, 2.59% from other races, and 1.33% from two or more races.

The median income for a household in the village was $61,585, and the median income for a family was $72,384. Males had a median income of $50,066 versus $38,393 for females. The per capita income for the village was $24,771. About 2.4% of families and 3.3% of the population were below the poverty line, including 1.9% of those under age 18 and 6.1% of those age 65 or over.

== Government ==
The Village of New Hyde Park has a mayor-council form of government with a mayor, a deputy mayor and four trustees, known collectively as the Board of Trustees. They are elected to serve a four-year term.

As of October 2021, the Mayor of New Hyde Park is Christopher Devane, the Deputy Mayor is Madhvi Nijjar, and the Village Trustees are Rainer Burger, Madhvi Nijjar, Arthur Savarese, and Donna M. Squicciarino.

== Education ==
=== School districts ===
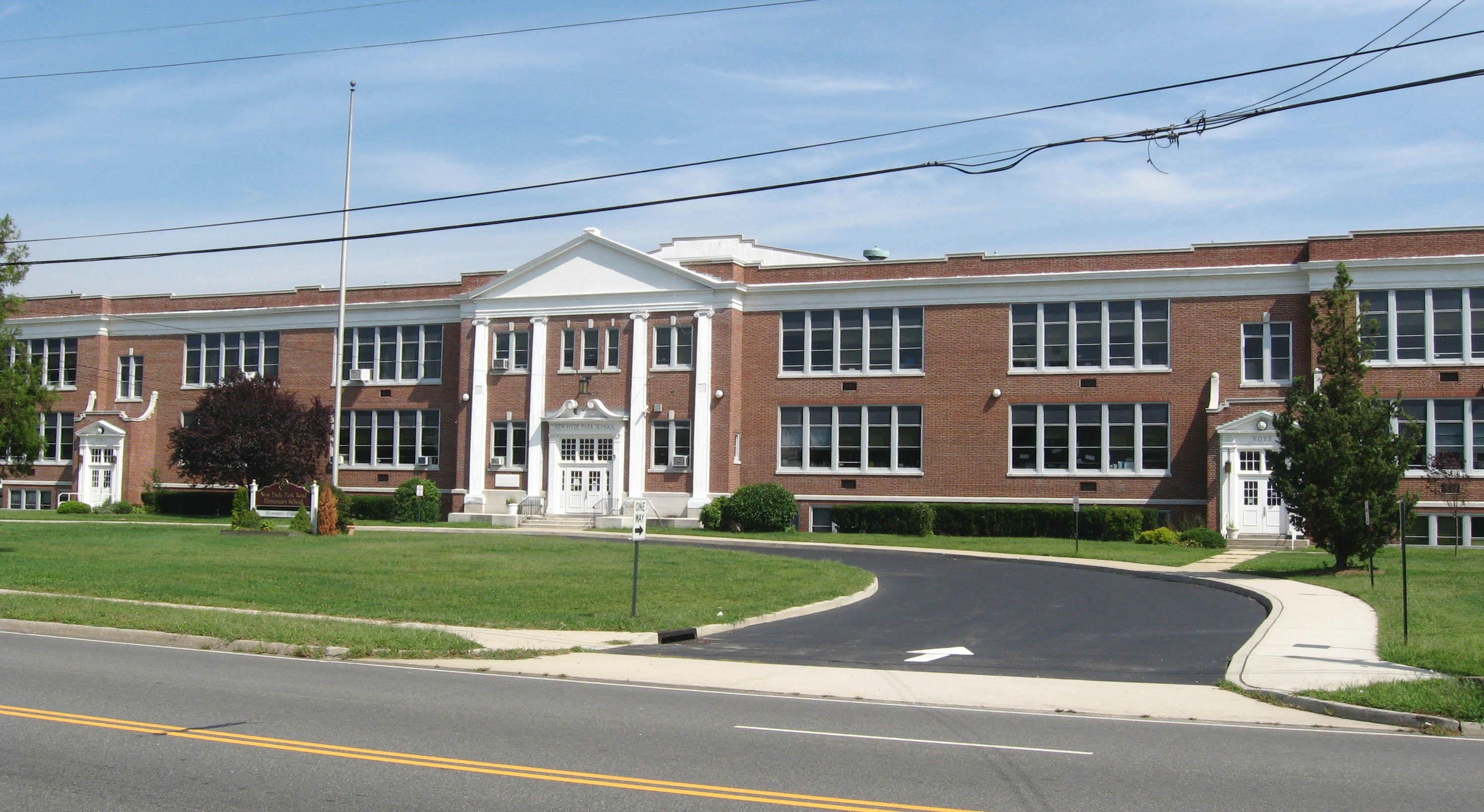
New Hyde Park Road Elementary School

Most of the Village of New Hyde Park is located within the boundaries of (and is thus served by) the New Hyde Park-Garden City Park School District, while some of it is zoned to the Elmont Union Free School District (both of which serve students in grades K-6). All of it is zoned to the Sewanhaka Central High School District (which serves students in grades 7-12 and includes New Hyde Park Memorial High School, Sewanhaka High School, Elmont Memorial High School, H. Frank Carey High School, and Floral Park Memorial High School).

As such, all children who reside within the village are assigned to go to school in one of these two elementary districts and the high school district, depending on their ages and grade levels.

As of 1997 some areas with New Hyde Park addresses that are in unincorporated areas are within the Great Neck Union Free School District or the Herricks Union Free School District.

=== Library district ===
The Village of New Hyde Park is located within the boundaries of (and is thus served by) New Hyde Park & Garden City Park's library district, which is served by the Hillside Public Library of New Hyde Park.

== Notable people ==
- Bob Avellini, professional football player
- Y. Bhekhirst, musician
- John F. Campbell, politician
- Gary Christenson, professional baseball player
- Luke Cummo, MMA practitioner and TUF 2 finalist
- Arthur Cutler, restaurateur known for founding Carmine's and Ollie's restaurant chains
- Crystal Dunn, professional soccer player
- Amy Halberstadt, social and developmental psychologist
- Mitch Horowitz (born 1965), writer in occult and esoteric themes
- Katerina Katakalides, 2016 Teen Miss New York.
- Joel Matthew, Student of New Hyde Park Memorial High School
- Pete Koch, professional football player
- Omar Mateen, perpetrator of the Orlando nightclub shooting
- Al Oerter, Olympic discus throw four-time gold medalist

== See also ==
- List of municipalities in New York
- North New Hyde Park, New York
