= Golden Throats =

Compilation album series

Golden Throats is Rhino Records' series of humorous compilations of critically lambasted cover versions of songs, performed mostly either by celebrities known for something other than musical talent or musicians not known for the genre from which the song they are covering comes.

== Examples ==
For example, William Shatner sings (or, more precisely, does a dramatic reading of the lyrics to) "Lucy in the Sky with Diamonds," Leonard Nimoy sings "If I Had a Hammer," and Muhammad Ali sings "Stand by Me." Other examples include the Bing Crosby cover of the Beatles' "Hey Jude" and the Mel Tormé cover of Donovan's "Sunshine Superman," as both were rock songs being covered by musicians of an older generation. In most cases, the songs appear to be performed sincerely, rather than in a spirit of irony or intentional goofiness. In many respects, these albums were among the first to anthologize lounge music, with their focus on "light" versions of contemporary hits.

== Inspiration ==
The series (of four albums) was created and produced by long-time Rhino staffer Gary Peterson and pop culture historian Pat Sierchio. Each release contained liner notes penned by acclaimed music historian Irwin Chusid, and most featured original art by Drew Friedman. The cover art parodied well-known albums (the Beatles' Sgt. Pepper's Lonely Hearts Club Band, the Rolling Stones' Their Satanic Majesties Request, the Byrds' Sweetheart of the Rodeo, and the infamous "butcher" cover of the Beatles' Yesterday and Today). The notoriety of the series contributed to William Shatner's decision to relaunch his musical career.

== Discography ==
There were a total of four albums in the series: They are:

- Golden Throats: The Great Celebrity Sing Off (LP: 1988; CD: 1992)
- Golden Throats 2: More Celebrity Rock Oddities! (1991)
- Golden Throats 3: Sweethearts of Rodeo Drive (1995)
- Golden Throats 4: Celebrities Butcher the Beatles (1997)

== Songs featured on the albums ==
=== Golden Throats: The Great Celebrity Sing Off ===
1. "Proud Mary" – Leonard Nimoy (1970)
2. "It Ain't Me, Babe" – Sebastian Cabot (1967)
3. "Blowin' in the Wind" – Eddie Albert (1966)
4. "Lucy in the Sky with Diamonds" – William Shatner (1968)
5. "A Whiter Shade of Pale" – Noel Harrison (1967)
6. "I Can See for Miles" – Frankie Randall (1968)
7. "Try a Little Tenderness" – Jack Webb (1958)
8. "Twist and Shout" – Mae West (1966)
9. "House of the Rising Sun" – Andy Griffith (1959)
10. "Mr. Tambourine Man" – William Shatner (1968)
11. "You Are the Sunshine of My Life" – Jim Nabors (1974)
12. "Like a Rolling Stone" – Sebastian Cabot (1967)
13. "White Room" – Joel Grey (1969)
14. "If I Had a Hammer" – Leonard Nimoy (1968)

=== Golden Throats 2: More Celebrity Rock Oddities ===
1. "John Shaft" – Sammy Davis Jr. (1972)
2. "Sunshine Superman" – Mel Tormé (1970)
3. "Light My Fire" – Mae West (1972)
4. "Hey Jude" – Bing Crosby (1968)
5. "All I Really Want To Do" – Sebastian Cabot (1967)
6. "Put A Little Love In Your Heart" – Leonard Nimoy (1970)
7. "It Was A Very Good Year" – William Shatner (1968)
8. "Dixie Chicken" – Jack Jones (1977)
9. "In The Ghetto" – Sammy Davis Jr. (1970)
10. "Nights On Broadway" – Chad Everett (1976)
11. "Stand By Me" – Cassius Clay (Muhammad Ali) (1964)
12. "Bridge Over Troubled Water" – Senator Sam J. Ervin Jr. (1973)
13. "(I Can't Get No) Satisfaction" – Phyllis Diller (1968)
14. "Give Peace a Chance" – Mitch Miller & The Gang (1970)

=== Golden Throats 3: Sweethearts of Rodeo Drive ===
1. "I Walk the Line" – Leonard Nimoy (1970)
2. "I'll Be Your Baby Tonight" – Goldie Hawn (1972)
3. "Hey, Good Lookin'" – John Davidson (1964)
4. "The Green, Green Grass Of Home" – Jack Palance (1970)
5. "Back Street Affair" – Carol Channing & Webb Pierce (1977)
6. "San Antonio Rose" – Michael Parks (1969)
7. "Almost Persuaded" – Louis Armstrong (1970)
8. "Ringo (French Version)" – Lorne Greene (1964)
9. "Tumbling Tumbleweeds" – Merv Griffin (1961)
10. "Your Cheatin' Heart" – Buddy Ebsen (1965)
11. "Mule Train" – Rod McKuen (1959)
12. "Cool Water" – Walter Brennan (1963)
13. "Folsom Prison Blues" – Living Marimbas Plus Voices (1970)
14. "Desperados Waiting for a Train" – Slim Pickens (1977)
15. "I Walk the Line" – Telly Savalas (1972)
16. "Peace In The Valley" – Wink Martindale (1959)
17. "Games People Play" – Jim Nabors (1970)

=== Golden Throats 4: Celebrities Butcher the Beatles ===
1. "In The Beginning/With A Little Help From My..." – George Burns (1969)
2. "She's Leaving Home" – Joel Grey (1969)
3. "Spleen/Lucy in the Sky with Diamonds" – William Shatner (1968)
4. "Something" – Telly Savalas (1974)
5. "Day Tripper" – Mae West (1966)
6. "Hey Jude" – Bing Crosby (1968)
7. "Michelle" – Xaviera Hollander (1973)
8. "Mission: Impossible Theme/Norwegian Wood" – Alan Copeland (1968)
9. "Let It Be" – Tennessee Ernie Ford (1970)
10. "Got to Get You into My Life" – Little Joe (Pesci) (1968)
11. "Revolution" – The Brothers Four (1969)
12. "She's A Woman" – Noel Harrison (1966)
13. "Jealous Guy/Don't Let Me Down" – Claudine Longet (1972)
14. "Piggies" – Theo Bikel (1969)
15. "Norwegian Wood (This Bird Has Flown)" – Jan & Dean (1966)
16. "A Hard Day's Night" – George Maharis (1966)
17. "Hidden Track #17" – Various Artists

== See also ==
- The Rhino Brothers Present the World's Worst Records
- Nuggets: Original Artyfacts from the First Psychedelic Era, 1965–1968
