= Lucia Pamela =

American musician

- Born: May 1, 1904; St. Louis, Missouri, U.S.
- Died: July 25, 2002 (aged 98); Los Angeles, California, U.S.
- Occupations: Musician; nightclub singer; bandleader
- Children: 2 including Georgia Frontiere

Lucia Pamela (May 1, 1904 – July 25, 2002) was an American musician, nightclub singer, bandleader, and eccentric. She is remembered today largely for a science fiction themed musical album and coloring book concerning an imaginary trip to the Moon.

== Biography ==
Pamela was born in St. Louis, Missouri. She traveled to Germany to study at the Beethoven Conservatory of Music and Voice, and joined Flo Ziegfeld's "Broadway Follies" after her return to the United States. She was voted Miss St. Louis in 1926.

She was featured in Ripley's Believe It or Not for memorizing 10,000 songs. She led the all-girl orchestra and Odeon Theatre house band the Musical Pirates, said by some to be the first all-female orchestra, and hosted radio programs including The Encouragement Hour, Kansas City, and Gal About Town, Fresno.

Into Outer Space with Lucia Pamela

Studio album by Lucia Pamela
- Released: 1969
- Studio: Moontown
- Genre: Children's, outsider, jazz
- Length: 35:55
- Label: Gulfstream

She produced only one album, Into Outer Space With Lucia Pamela (circa 1969, Gulfstream and later on L'Peg), whose songs are mostly about an imaginary trip to the moon. Described by Neil Strauss as having "the feel of a warped bebop children's album, it features Ms. Pamela on all instruments – piano, accordion, drums, clarinet, and probably various household appliances – accompanying herself as she tells, with gee-whiz glee, tales of amiable lunar roosters, trips to Mars and blue winds." "She played fifteen instruments, including the piano, clarinet, drums, cymbals and what sounds like a theremin."

1. "Moontown"
2. "Walking on the Moon"
3. "Flip Flop Fly"
4. "Dear Me"
5. "You and Your Big Ideas"
6. "What To Do Is the Question"
7. "Hap-Hap-Happy Heart"
8. "Indian Alphabet Chant (a-i-iddy-i-o-o-o)"
9. "Why? Because I Want To"
10. "In Love, In Love"
11. "I've Got a Song"
12. "Blue Wind"
13. "In the Year 2,000!!!"

The song "Flip Flop Fly" was featured on the radio by Bob and Ray in 1973, but the album was all but forgotten before being reissued in 1992 (record label: Arf! Arf!, recorded from a vinyl source and produced by Irwin Chusid, catalogue #AA-037) to greater acclaim. According to Chusid, "Lucia's performances are spirited and energetic, without an ounce of self-consciousness."

She also produced a cartoon coloring book, Into Outer Space with Lucia Pamela in the Year 2000. In 1994, the pop group Stereolab recorded a tribute to her, "International Colouring Contest", on their album Mars Audiac Quintet; the intro of the song includes a voice sample of Pamela herself.

She died in 2002, age 98, in Los Angeles. Later that year, Tony Kushner wrote a short play about Lucia Pamela called "Flip Flop Fly". The play imagines Pamela meeting Queen Geraldine of Albania (who also died in 2002) on the Moon.

== Family ==
Her daughter was Georgia Frontiere (1927–2008), owner of the Los Angeles/St. Louis Rams, and her son is Kenneth Francis Irwin. Lucia and Georgia performed duets as the Pamela Sisters.
