= Irwin Chusid =

American journalist (born 1951)

Irwin Chusid (born April 22, 1951 in Newark, New Jersey) is a journalist, music historian, radio personality, record producer, and self-described "landmark preservationist". His stated mission has been to "find things on the scrapheap of history that I know don't belong there and salvage them." Those "things" have included such previously overlooked but now-celebrated icons as composer/bandleader/electronic music pioneer Raymond Scott, Space Age Pop avatar Esquivel, illustrator/fine artist Jim Flora, various outsider musicians (including William "Shooby" Taylor, a.k.a. "The Human Horn"), and The Langley Schools Music Project. Chusid calls himself "a connoisseur of marginalia," while admitting he's "a terrible barometer of popular taste."

Chusid oversees the catalog of the late Afrofuturist artist/composer/bandleader Sun Ra and administers Ra's music rights on behalf of the artist's heirs. His book, Sun Ra: Art on Saturn — The Album Cover Art of Sun Ra's Saturn Label, compiled with Chris Reisman, was published by Fantagraphics in November 2022.

His journalism has appeared in Mojo, The New York Times, Film Comment, Mix magazine, New York Press, Pulse! and other publications. In 2021 he authored a biography of 19th century baseball legend Joe Start for the Society for American Baseball Research's BioProject.

Chusid has lived in Hoboken, New Jersey, since 1992. He describes his political views as "leaning libertarian".

== Radio ==
Since 1975 Chusid has been a DJ on free-form radio station WFMU, where he hosts an unpredictable and idiosyncratic weekly program whose content he calls "genre-surfing tokenism". Prior to his involvement at WFMU, he worked briefly at WPKN radio from 1969-1971 while an undergrad at the University of Bridgeport (which he left after two years); in 1977, while living in New Orleans, he hosted a weekly program on WTUL. In 1988, he served as a comedy writer for author/humorist Tom Bodett's syndicated radio series, The End of the Road.

In the late 1970s, Chusid was one of the first DJs to regularly air recordings of Jandek, The Shaggs, Lucia Pamela, and R. Stevie Moore on the radio. In the early 1980s he programmed a weekly segment entitled The Atrocious Music Hour, which featured recordings from such non-musical celebrities as William Shatner and Leonard Nimoy. This subgenre was eventually chronicled by Rhino Records on their Golden Throats series of albums, for which Chusid authored liner notes. These compilations contributed to Shatner's revived celebrity, albeit with overtones of self-parody.

Between 1997 and 2002 Chusid was the co-host (with Michelle Boulé) of the Incorrect Music Hour on WFMU. From 2005 to 2007 he programmed vintage Calypso, Soca, Goombay, and Mento on a one-hour weekly program entitled Muriel's Treasure.

== Music projects ==
Chusid is credited with the rediscovery and popularization of the "Space Age Bachelor Pad" music of Juan García Esquivel, which helped spark the 1990s resurgence of vintage exotica and lounge music. He compiled the first CD reissues of Esquivel and Raymond Scott, and manages the musical estates of both deceased composers/bandleaders. He has produced landmark reissues by The Shaggs, Sun Ra, Wendy and Bonnie, Judson Fountain, Lucia Pamela, and Alabama folk-art ensemble The Clouds, while penning liner notes for dozens of CD and LP releases on a multitude of labels. He produced Raymond Scott Rewired, an album of Scott remixes by The Bran Flakes, The Evolution Control Committee, and Go Home Productions, which was released in February 2014 on the Basta label.

In 2000, Chusid discovered two privately pressed LPs of western Canadian schoolchildren, recorded in 1976-77 by music teacher Hans Fenger. After much legwork and ten label rejections, Chusid licensed the project to Netherlands-based Basta Audio-Visuals and (for North America) Hoboken-based Bar/None Records, who in October 2001 released the recordings on a CD entitled The Langley Schools Music Project. Within one week of its release, the album went to No. 1 in sales on Amazon.com. The critical acclaim and popular reception for the CD led to a VH1 documentary in 2002, which sent the CD back to #2 on Amazon.com. Jack Black's 2003 hit film School of Rock was admittedly inspired by the Langley CD. In 2005, the story rights to the project were acquired by an undisclosed Hollywood film writer/director, who hopes to bring the story to the big screen. In a dismissive review of the album, former Village Voice music critic Robert Christgau referred to Chusid as "a tedious ideologue with a hustle."

In 2002, Chusid produced the sole album by the New York-based septet The Raymond Scott Orchestrette (a band he formed in 1999). That same year he produced the first solo sessions of former Suddenly, Tammy! singer/songwriter Beth Sorrentino, released in 2006 as Nine Songs, One Story. In 2011, he co-conceived and coordinated Sorrentino's album Would You Like To Go: A Curt Boettcher Songbook, a collection of reinterpretations of songs written by and/or associated with sunshine pop progenitor Curt Boettcher. (The album, produced by Sean Slade, was released in April 2013 on the Basta label. Chusid was credited as "Solicitor and Overseer.") In 2013, he undertook administration of Boettcher's publishing on behalf of the late songwriter's son, Varek Boettcher.

In 1997 Chusid co-produced (with Edie Adams and Josh Mills) the Ernie Kovacs Record Collection (Varese-Sarabande), a compilation of songs and themes used by the legendary TV comedian in his programs during the 1950s and early 1960s. The package was designed by noted illustrator Chris Ware. In 2004 he curated Interesting Results: Music by a Committee of One for UK's Sonic Arts Network, a CD-publication of DIY music with cut-out figures of the featured artists.

In 2010 Chusid compiled for WFMU Don't Mess With the Power Child, the first collection of late 1980s recordings by an uninhibited, hyperactive 10-year-old Alabama girl named Amanda (Whitt). These recordings aired frequently on WFMU and subsequently achieved widespread notoriety via the web. A follow-up, Let's Get Plastered and Raid Circus World, was compiled for WFMU in 2011.

Besides administering the Raymond Scott, Esquivel, Bob Thompson, Sun Ra, Curt Boettcher, and Shooby Taylor musical estates, he oversees the business affairs and publishing of R. Stevie Moore, Beth Sorrentino, the Mighty Sparrow, and Wendy & Bonnie.

In 2014 Chusid became administrator of Sun Ra LLC, the heirs who control the catalog of the late, eccentric Afrofuturist bandleader/composer. That year, he and Michael D. Anderson of the Sun Ra Music Archive co-produced a digital-only series of classic Sun Ra albums remastered for iTunes from original Sun Ra session tapes. Since then Chusid has produced, co-produced, or consulted on a series of remastered Sun Ra recordings, including previously unissued material, released on the Cosmic Myth, Modern Harmonic, Strut, and Corbett vs. Dempsey record labels. As of late 2020, there have been over 100 Sun Ra titles digitally reissued on the catalog's Bandcamp site. Chusid has provided historical annotation for many of these releases. In 2019 he co-produced (with Brother Cleve) The Barrence Whitfield Soul Savage Arkestra: Songs from the Sun Ra Cosmos (Modern Harmonic), a collection of Sun Ra covers by rock vocalist Barrence Whitfield; Chusid played drums on several tracks. Also in 2019 Chusid produced June Tyson: Saturnian Queen of the Sun Ra Arkestra (Modern Harmonic), the first compilation of recordings spotlighting singer-dancer-costume designer Tyson, the only female member of Sun Ra's Arkestra.

In 2013, Chusid created the first website devoted to the late record producer Tom Wilson, including a comprehensive discography of Wilson productions.

== Outsider music ==
In a July 1996 Pulse magazine article entitled "You Want Alternative?", Chusid coined the term "outsider music", which he defines as "crackpot and visionary music, where all trails lead essentially one place: over the edge". Chusid has drawn a distinction between the terms "incorrect music" (as used on his WFMU radio program) and "outsider music", which he insists are not synonymous and overlap only slightly. Chusid has explained that Incorrect Music was a radio concept, which included all manner of musical "wrongness", often by people who should have known better, or whose sincerity was questionable. Outsider musicians, on the other hand, he defines as "artists who are often termed 'bad' or 'inept' by listeners who judge them by the standards of mainstream popular music. Yet despite dodgy rhythms and a lack of conventional tunefulness, these often self-taught artists radiate an abundance of earnestness and passion. Most importantly, they betray an absence of pretense. And they're worth listening to, often outmatching all contenders for inventiveness and originality."

His book Songs in the Key of Z: The Curious Universe of Outsider Music (2000), published by A Cappella Books, covered musical oddballs and obscure visionaries. Reviewing this testament to twisted tunesmiths, Publishers Weekly commented:

He profiles 20 darlings of dissonance. Several of them -- including Tiny Tim, Captain Beefheart and Pink Floyd's former acid troubadour Syd Barrett -- have made a few compilation bangs, but the great majority have enjoyed mere dog-like whimpers of success. Take Eilert Pilarm, the Swedish Elvis; Joe Meek, who produced the 1962 instrumental hit 'Telstar' before committing suicide; and The Shaggs, three sheltered sisters from Fremont, N.H., who recorded the 'aboriginal rock' masterpiece 'Philosophy of the World'. Careful not to ridicule his more eccentrically volatile subjects (e.g., Wesley Willis and Daniel Johnston), Chusid narrates each musician's vital statistics and career with rhythm and respectful compilation wit.

The book also includes brief profiles of numerous lesser-known outsider musicians, including Arcesia, Bingo Gazingo, and Y. Bhekhirst.

BJ Snowden, Shooby Taylor ("The Human Horn"), Wesley Willis, and other musicians profiled in the book can be heard on two CDs produced and annotated by Chusid. In a 25th anniversary retrospective, Brad Shoup of Pitchfork wrote:

Released at the decadent height of the CD Age, when pop’s biggest stars were routinely moving a million albums a week, Songs in the Key of Z (simultaneously released as a book and album) was the first major attempt to define and survey “outsider music.” The album presents 20 songs from the late ’60s to the mid-’90s, all recorded by artists on the musical fringe. Some of them were artists Chusid had first shared on WFMU; others were thrift-store finds or esoterica passed around record-collector circles. In a departure from the way outsider music was generally conceived, several cuts were pulled from so-called “vanity” records: limited-run, self-released albums that were previously only of interest to hardcore cratediggers.

Volumes one and two of the digital audio releases of Songs in the Key of Z were reissued in expanded (25 tracks each) and remastered format in September 2013, along with all-new volumes three and four.

== Visual arts projects ==
Chusid chronicled the overlooked work of innovative record cover artist/commercial illustrator Jim Flora (1914–1998) in his colorful 180-page trade paperback, The Mischievous Art of Jim Flora (Fantagraphics, 2004). A follow-up, The Curiously Sinister Art of Jim Flora, co-authored with (former KFAI radio host) Barbara Economon, was published by Fantagraphics in February 2007. The latter book unveiled Flora's bizarre and rarely seen paintings, woodcuts, sketches, and early works. A third anthology, The Sweetly Diabolic Art of Jim Flora, was published in July 2009. A fourth book, The High Fidelity Art of Jim Flora, focusing on Flora's illustrated album covers and music ephemera for Columbia and RCA Victor Records, was published in September 2013. Chusid and Economon serve as co-archivists for the Flora collection, and produce a line of fine art prints of the artist's work.

In May 2009, Chusid and Economon teamed up with artist Drew Friedman to produce an exclusive line of limited edition fine art prints of the noted illustrator's works.

In 2020 Chusid curated the first website devoted to the artistic legacy of musician/painter Ayé Aton, who had played with Sun Ra for a number of years.
