= Dr. Demento 20th Anniversary Collection =

1991 compilation album

Compilation album by Various artists
- Released: 1991
- Genre: Comedy rock; novelty songs
- Length: 1:55:00
- Label: Rhino Records
- Producer: Various

Professional ratings
Review scores
Source	Rating
allmusic	5/5 stars

Dr. Demento 20th Anniversary Collection is a release by radio disc jockey Dr. Demento to celebrate 20 years since the beginning of his radio career and novelty song show. It covers many of the novelty and comedy songs from the 1950s to the 1980s, such as “Does Your Chewing Gum Lose Its Flavour (On the Bedpost Overnight)” by Lonnie Donegan & His Skiffle Group, to “Eat It” by "Weird Al" Yankovic, whose popularity was boosted by Demento.

== Track listing ==
=== Disc one ===
#	Title	Performer(s)	Time	Writer(s)	Year released
1	"Delicious"	Backus, Jim & Friend	3:09	Buddy Kaye	1958
2	"The Scotsman"	Bryan Bowers	2:27	Mike Cross	1980
3	"Junk Food Junkie"	Larry Groce	3:05	Larry Groce	1976
4	"Eat It"	"Weird Al" Yankovic	3:20	Michael Jackson/Alfred Yankovic	1984
5	"Does Your Chewing Gum Lose Its Flavour (On the Bedpost Overnight)"	Lonnie Donegan & His Skiffle Group	2:30	Marty Bloom/Ernest Breur/Billy Rose	1958
6	"Wet Dream"	Kip Addotta	5:08	Biff Manard/Kip Addotta	1984
7	"Hello Muddah, Hello Fadduh"	Allan Sherman	2:49	Allan Sherman/Lou Busch	1963
8	"Wappin'"	Darrell Hammond & Christopher Snell	3:02	Christopher Snell	1989
9	"The Purple People Eater"	Sheb Wooley	2:15	Sheb Wooley	1958
10	"Monster Mash"	Bobby "Boris" Pickett & the Crypt Kickers	3:13	Bobby Pickett/Leonard L. Capizzi	1962
11	"Cocktails for Two"	Spike Jones and his City Slickers	2:58	Arthur Johnston/Sam Coslow	1944
12	"Transfusion"	Nervous Norvus	2:27	Jimmy Drake	1956
13	"Beep Beep"	The Playmates	2:47	Carl Cicchetti/Donald Claps	1958
14	"St. George and the Dragonet"	Stan Freberg	3:26	Daws Butler/Stan Freberg/Walter Schumann	1953
15	"Witch Doctor"	David Seville	2:21	Ross Bagdasarian Sr.	1958
16	"Gitarzan"	Ray Stevens	3:15	Bill Everette/Ray Stevens	1969
17	"Earache My Eye"	Cheech & Chong feat. Alice Bowie	5:22	Cheech Marin/Gaye Delorme/Thomas Chong	1974
18	"Dead Puppies"	Ogden Edsl	2:12	Bill Frenzer/Rich Thieman	1977

=== Disc two ===
#	Title	Performer(s)	Time	Writer(s)	Year released
1	"Dancin' Fool"	Frank Zappa	3:36	Frank Zappa	1979
2	"Star Trekkin'"	The Firm	3:47	Grahame Lister/John O'Connor	1987
3	"The Time Warp"	The Rocky Horror Picture Show Cast	3:19	Richard O'Brien	1975
4	"The Masochism Tango"	Tom Lehrer	2:56	Tom Lehrer	1959
5	"The Homecoming Queen's Got a Gun"	Julie Brown	4:41	Julie Brown/Charles Coffey/Ray Colcord/Terrence McNally	1984
6	"The Ballad of Irving"	Frank Gallop/Phil Leeds	3:27	John Aylesworth/Frank Peppiatt/Dick Williams	1966
7	"The Battle of Kookamonga"	Homer & Jethro	2:39	Jimmie Driftwood/J. J. Reynolds	1960
8	"King Tut"	Steve Martin	2:39	Steve Martin	1978
9	"Der Fuehrer's Face"	Spike Jones and His City Slickers	2:12	Oliver Wallace	1942
10	"Fish Heads"	Barnes and Barnes	2:26	Artie Barnes	1980
11	"Poisoning Pigeons in the Park"	Tom Lehrer	2:09	Tom Lehrer	1959
12	"Sarah Cynthia Sylvia Stout Would Not Take the Garbage Out"	Shel Silverstein	2:47	Shel Silverstein	1969
13	"The Cockroach That Ate Cincinnati"	Rose & The Arrangement	2:11	Drill	1974
14	"Surfin' Bird"	The Trashmen	2:24	Al Frazier/Robert Harris/Carl White/Turner Wilson	1963
15	"Pencil Neck Geek"	Freddie Blassie	3:29	Pete Cicero/Martin Margulies	1975
16	"Ti Kwan Leep/Boot to the Head"	The Frantics	6:08	The Frantics	1987
17	"Existential Blues"	Tom "T-Bone" Stankus	6:14	Tom "T-Bone" Stankus	1979
18	"They're Coming to Take Me Away, Ha-Haaa!"	Napoleon XIV	2:10	N. Bonaparte (Jerry Samuels)	1966
