= The Rhino Brothers Present the World's Worst Records =

Compilation album by various artists
- Released: 1983
- Label: Rhino

The Rhino Brothers Present the World's Worst Records is a compilation album released by Rhino Records in 1983. It purports to compile the worst music ever recorded and features mostly novelty songs, parodies and cover versions of popular songs, performed very poorly (though in many cases, intentionally so, either as a novelty or as a joke). The original album included an airsickness bag and a warning that the album "may cause internal discomfort". Dr. Demento wrote the liner notes for the album.

== Content ==
The original 1983 album included two musicians, the Legendary Stardust Cowboy and Wild Man Fischer, who later became associated with the outsider music movement (Edith Massey has also been associated with that movement to an extent). None of the songs on the first album were top-40 hits, and only one act on that album, The Turtles (whose experimental and uncharacteristic piece "Umbassa and the Dragon" is included), contributed substantially to popular music. Ogden Edsl and Barnes and Barnes both achieved notoriety in the novelty music field.

A second volume was released in 1985, with a slightly different focus.

== Track listing ==
=== Volume 1 ===
1. "The Crusher" (The Novas) (see also: The Crusher (wrestler))
2. "Big Girls Don't Cry" (Edith Massey and The Eggs)
3. "I Want My Baby Back" (Jimmy Cross)
4. "I Like" (Heathen Dan)
5. "Kazooed on Klassics" (The Temple City Kazoo Orchestra)
6. "Fluffy" (Gloria Balsam)
7. "Paralyzed" (Legendary Stardust Cowboy)
8. "I Wanna Be Your Dog" (The Seven Stooges)
9. "Boogie Woogie Amputee" (Barnes and Barnes)
10. "Kinko the Clown" (Ogden Edsl)
11. "Umbassa and the Dragon" (The Turtles)
12. "Ugly" (Johnny Meeskite)
13. "Surfin' Tragedy" (The Breakers)
14. "Young at Heart" (Wild Man Fischer)

=== Volume 2 ===
A follow-up album was released in 1985, under the title The Rhino Brothers Present the World's Worst Records, Vol. 2. This volume featured some more recognizable names from the novelty music field; it also included at least one top-40 hit ("Nag" by The Halos) and was more focused on the comedy than the outright-bad tone of its predecessor.

1. "Downtown" (Mrs. Miller)
2. "K'nish Doctor" (Mickey Katz)
3. "Party in My Pants" (Barnes and Barnes)
4. "Foreign Novelty Smash" (The Credibility Gap)
5. "Nag" (The Halos)
6. "Who Hid the Halibut on the Poop Deck" (Yogi Yorgesson)
7. "Goodbye Sam" (Shad O'Shea)
8. "Just a Big Ego" (Bob Rivers and Zip)
9. "Candy Rapper" (Bird & MacDonald, misattributed to "Sticky Fingers")
10. "Hands" (Debbie Dawn)
11. "Baseball Card Lover" (Rockin' Richie Ray)
12. "Fudd on the Hill" (Little Roger and the Goosebumps)
13. "I Live in a Split Level Head" (Napoleon XIV)
14. "Teenage Enema Nurses in Bondage" (Killer Pussy)
15. "The Troggs Tapes" (The Troggs)

== Reception ==
A review at AllMusic stated, "The Rhino Brothers Present the World's Worst Records! anticipated this trend several years in advance, proposing that "bad" was infinitely better than "boring," though their overdependence on prefab wackiness lessens the importance of the package."

== See also ==
- Golden Throats
- List of music considered the worst
