= Amazing Adult Fantasy (album) =

Studio album by Barnes & Barnes
- Released: 1984; July 2005 (reissue)
- Recorded: Lumania, 1983–1984
- Genre: Comedy rock, synthpop, new wave
- Length: 43:29; 72:40 (reissue)
- Label: Rhino Records; Oglio Records (reissue)
- Producer: Barnes & Barnes

Barnes & Barnes chronology
Soak It Up (1983)	Amazing Adult Fantasy (1984)	Sicks (1986)

Professional ratings
Review scores
Source	Rating
Allmusic	3/5 stars

Amazing Adult Fantasy is the fifth album released by novelty rock group Barnes & Barnes. It was originally released in 1984 by Rhino Records, and rereleased in 2005 by Oglio Records. After the failure of their previous effort, the Soak It Up EP, Barnes & Barnes were dropped from Boulevard Records, and promptly re-signed with Rhino Records. This album showcases the later stage of their effort to abandon novelty music and record more contemporary material, although the album does contain some comedic elements. Despite this, it is the lowest-selling Barnes & Barnes album of all time. The title is derived from the Marvel comic book Amazing Adult Fantasy, and features the cover of issue #10 in the album art.

Bill Mumy distinguishes it as his favorite Barnes & Barnes album.

Two songs originally slated to be included on the LP, "Blithering" and "You Can't Escape Your Destiny", were dropped at the last minute due to phasing problems discovered during mastering. The 2005 CD restores them to their original places in the album sequence. "Blithering" was later re-recorded in 1987 with producer Gerry Beckley for inclusion on Zabagabee: The Best of Barnes & Barnes.

== Track listing ==
1. "Learn To Kiss The Enemy" — (4:47)
2. "Don't You Wanna Go To The Moon" — (3:37)
3. "Modern Romantic Point Of View" — (3:27)
4. "Nothing Funny" — (2:41)
5. "I Don't Remember Tomorrow" — (3:47)
6. "Life Is Safer When You're Sleeping" — (4:07)
7. "Don't Be A Singer" — (4:03)
8. "I Want To Live In Your Brain" — (3:27)
9. "ZZ Top Beard" — (3:06)
10. "Music Doesn't Matter" — (0:28)
11. "Ah A" — (1:31)
12. "The Little Man" — (2:01)
13. "Music Spazchow — (3:05)
14. "Bang Bang" — (3:39)

== 2005 Reissue ==
1. "Learn To Kiss The Enemy" — (4:47)
2. "Don't You Wanna Go To The Moon" — (3:37)
3. "Modern Romantic Point Of View" — (3:27)
4. "Blithering" — (2:15)
5. "Nothing Funny" — (2:41)
6. "I Don't Remember Tomorrow" — (3:47)
7. "Life Is Safer When You're Sleeping" — (4:08)
8. "Don't Be A Singer" — (4:03)
9. "I Want To Live In Your Brain" — (3:27)
10. "ZZ Top Beard" — (3:06)
11. "Music Doesn't Matter" — (0:28)
12. "Ah A" — (1:31)
13. "The Little Man" — (2:01)
14. "Music Spazchow — (3:05)
15. "You Can't Escape Your Destiny" — (3:02)
16. "Bang Bang" — (3:39)
17. "The Quiet Point" (bonus track) — (0:42)
18. "Walk My Dog" (bonus track) — (4:29)
19. "Life is Harsh Reality" (bonus track) — (3:40)
20. "The Ballad of Jim Joy" — (3:03)
21. "The Little Man" (Original Version)(bonus track) — (2:02)
22. "Loch Ness Lady" (bonus track) — (1:30)
23. "Oh Me Oh My" (bonus track) — (3:50)
24. "The Inevitable Song" (Second Version)(bonus track) — (4:44)
