= Derailroaded: Inside the Mind of Wild Man Fischer =

Derailroaded: Inside The Mind Of Wild Man Fischer
- Directed by: Josh Rubin
- Produced by: Jeremy Lubin
- Cinematography: Bryan Newman
- Edited by: Josh Rubin; Jeremy Lubin; Howard Leder
- Music by: Wild Man Fischer
- Production company: Ubin Twinz
- Release date: March 19, 2005 (SXSW)
- Running time: 86 minutes
- Country: United States
- Language: English

Derailroaded: Inside The Mind Of Wild Man Fischer is a 2005 documentary film, directed by Josh Rubin and Jeremy Lubin, aka The Ubin Twinz about outsider artist Wild Man Fischer.

== The film ==
The film chronicles the life of Lawrence Fischer, known as Wild Man Fischer, an outsider artist who went in and out of several mental institutions when he was a child. It is composed of archive footage, interviews with people who were once associated with him, and interviews with Fischer himself. During the 1960s he was a street singer in L.A., which resulted in a cameo appearance in Rowan & Martin's Laugh-In in 1968. The same year Frank Zappa gave him the opportunity to record his first album, An Evening with Wild Man Fischer. Fischer's eccentric personality provided some truly unique music, but his mental problems rapidly ended his career. Fischer had paranoia and schizophrenia and thus became impossible to work with, despite the best efforts of other artists (Barnes & Barnes, Rosemary Clooney, Zappa) to help him. Despite his cult reputation Fischer remained a poor street musician until around 2004, where he was eventually institutionalized and medicated. While his medications controlled his schizophrenia, they also suppressed his creativity.

== Cast ==
- Wild Man Fischer
- "Weird Al" Yankovic
- Solomon Burke
- Gail Zappa
- Frank Zappa (archive footage)
- Barnes & Barnes
- Dennis P. Eichorn
- Miguel Ferrer
- Dr. Demento
- Mark Mothersbaugh

== Release ==
The film premiered at the SXSW Film Festival in Austin, Texas. MVD Entertainmanet Group released it on DVD in the US on March 22, 2011.

== Reception ==
Rotten Tomatoes, a review aggregator, reports that 71% of seven surveyed critics gave the film a positive review; the average rating is 6/10. Metacritic rated it 57/100 based on seven reviews. Joe Leydon of Variety called it "as discomfortingly fascinating as listening to a couple's heated argument at a table near yours in a restaurant". Stephen Holden of The New York Times wrote, "Not everyone who watches this sad, disturbing film with its flashy, animated embellishments will agree that what Mr. Fischer does is art, whether outsider or any other kind." Eli Kooris of The Austin Chronicle called it a "fascinating documentary" that rightly never answers the question of whether Fischer is a genius or lunatic. Drew Tillman of The Village Voice wrote, "This bungled documentary on outsider music legend Larry 'Wild Man' Fischer mistakes exploitation for empathy". Peter Bradshaw of The Guardian rated it 3/5 stars and wrote that it "works as a B-side to Terry Zwigoff's classic biography of R Crumb".
