= Boulevard Records =

Boulevard Records may refer to:

- Boulevard Records (U.S.), an American record label (fl. 1954)
- Boulevard Records (Canada), a Canadian record label of the 1980s

== Similar names ==
- Blues Boulevard Records, a Florida based record label
