= Arny Schorr =

American business executive

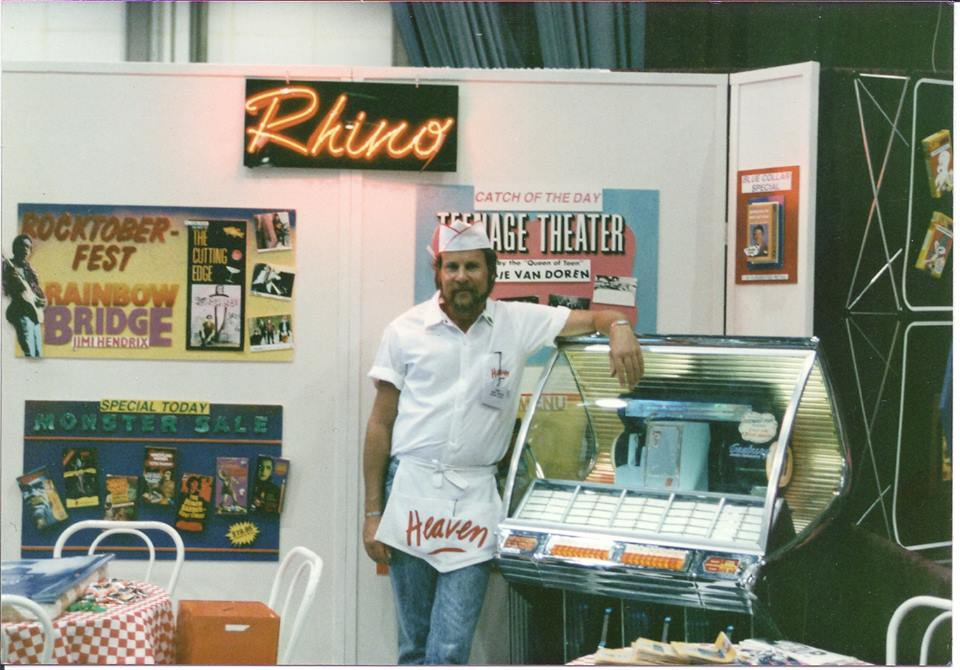
Arny Schorr manning the Rhino Video booth at the 1988 VSDA show in Las Vegas

Arny Schorr is an executive in the home entertainment industry, both in home video and music. He was head of acquisitions for Rhino Home Video, and also founded S'More Entertainment and Back Beat Records, companies that reissue older TV programs and music.

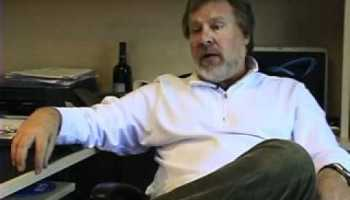
Arny Schorr of S’more Entertainment, a music and video B-to-B distribution company

== Early life and education ==
Born in Kew Gardens, Queens, New York, in 1947, Schorr moved to West Hartford, CT around 1951. He graduated from William H. Hall High School in 1965, and later attended Temple University, and Manchester Community College.

== Career ==
In 1977 Schorr moved to Londonderry, New Hampshire as a result of his promotion to branch manager of ABC Records. He later joined Magnetic Video and MGM/CBS Home Video.

From 1986 to 2002 he headed up acquisitions for Rhino Home Video where he grew the library to 500 titles before the company was purchased by Time-Warner, and worked with SOFA Home Entertainment between 2002 and 2004 in licensing the Ed Sullivan Show catalog in the home video and broadcast markets worldwide.

In 2005, Schorr created S'more Entertainment to distribute classic TV shows, long form music projects, cult programming and audio entertainment.

Schorr also served as producer for several direct to video programs including the Dr. Demento 20th Anniversary Collection, Ed Wood: Look Back in Angora and Muppets Magic from 'The Ed Sullivan Show'.

In 2011, Schorr founded Rock Beat records, to reissue older music.

== Personal life ==
Arny Schorr married Lynne Oliver in around 1973 and had identical twin daughters in 1979. He later divorced and moved to Los Angeles in 1982, met and married his current wife Joyce in 1986, and moved to Kingston, MA in June, 2019.
