= Soak It Up =

EP by Barnes & Barnes
- Released: August 1983; July 2005 (reissue with Kodovoner)
- Recorded: Lumania, 1981–1983; Mixed at The Village Recorder
- Genres: Comedy rock, new wave
- Length: 18:05
- Labels: Boulevard Records; Oglio Records (reissue with Kodovoner)
- Producers: Barnes & Barnes

Barnes & Barnes chronology
Fish Heads: Barnes & Barnes' Greatest Hits (1982)	Soak It Up (1983)	Amazing Adult Fantasy (1984)

Professional ratings
Review scores
Source	Rating
AllMusic	2/5 stars

Soak It Up is the third EP (though second canonically) released by comedy rock group Barnes & Barnes. It was released in August 1983 by Boulevard Records, and re-released in 2005 on Oglio Records. This EP was recorded as part of a project Haimer and Mumy called "Code of Honor", a collection of songs written and recorded between 1981 and 1983 with an overall theme of optimism. Shortly after this EP was released, a full album was slated to also be released, entitled Code of Honor. However, due to the low sales of this EP, Barnes & Barnes were dropped from the Boulevard label. The Code of Honor album as a whole remained unreleased until 2005, when it was issued on CD under the title Kodovoner with bonus tracks and the five Soak It Up tracks.

== Track listing ==
All songs are by Barnes & Barnes, unless otherwise noted.

Side one

1. "Soak It Up" — (3:18)
2. "Before You Leave (Positive Life)" — (4:42) (Mark Mothersbaugh/Barnes & Barnes)

Side two

1. "Succeed" — (3:03)
2. "Monkey Life" — (3:09) (Barnes & Barnes/Annerose Bucklers)
3. "Objectivity" — (3:41)

== Contributions ==
Mark Mothersbaugh is listed as primary writer of "Before You Leave" because the beat track is from the Devo song, "I Desire". Mark is a long-time friend of Art and Artie and appears as Booji Boy in the Zabagabee video release.

The voice at the beginning of "Objectivity" is an impression of Curly from The Three Stooges. One of Curly's famous quotes is "If at first you don't succeed, keep on suckin' till you do succeed.", which is also where the primary pun of the song "Succeed" comes from.
