= Cemetery Girls =

Cemetery Girls may refer to:

== Films ==
- Cemetery Girls, an alternative title for Count Dracula's Great Love (originally El gran amor del conde Drácula), a 1974 Spanish film directed by Javier Aguirre
- Cemetery Girls, an alternative title for The Velvet Vampire, an American vampire movie from 1971 directed by Stephanie Rothman
- Cemetery Girls, an alternative title for Vampire Hookers, a 1978 film directed by Cirio H. Santiago

== Music ==
- "Cemetery Girls", a song on Voobaha, the 1980 debut album by novelty rock group Barnes & Barnes
- "Cemetery Girls", a song on Abominations (album), the 2007 studio album by Schoolyard Heroes
- "Cemetery Girls", a song on Mutilation Mix, the 1997 greatest hits album by American hip hop group Insane Clown Posse
