= Pineapple Princess =

1960 song written by the Sherman Brothers

Single by Annette Funicello

from the album Hawaiiannette
- B-side: "Luau Cha Cha Cha"
- Released: July 1960
- Genre: Pop
- Length: 2:30
- Label: Buena Vista
- Songwriters: Robert B. Sherman, Richard M. Sherman
- Producer: Tutti Camarata

"Pineapple Princess" is an American pop song made popular by Annette Funicello in the summer of 1960. "Pineapple Princess" was written by the Sherman Brothers. It appeared on the LP album Hawaiiannette.

== Chart performance ==
As a single, it reached the top 15 in the three major US trade publications: Billboard, Cash Box, and Music Vendor, peaking at number eleven on the Hot 100. In Canada it reached number 13 on the CHUM Charts.

== Cover versions ==
- In 1964, the Quinto Sisters recorded the song as a single for Columbia Records and performed it on NBC-TV for Mitch Miller’s Sing Along with Mitch.
- The novelty-rock band Barnes & Barnes performed a cover of this song on their 1986 album Sicks.
- In 1999, the song was covered by the Hawaiian group Na Leo Pilimehana. Of course, there are no crocodiles in Hawai’i But there are many ‘ukuleles.
- In 2014, a remix of the song by Kinsey Moore was released as a part of Walt Disney Records' album, Dconstructed.
- A German version by Margrit Imlau was recorded, titled An-nana-nana-nas-Prinzessin.

== Popular culture ==
- In The Andy Griffith Show episode "Those Gossipin' Men", Floyd the barber's son Randolph plays "Pineapple Princess" on his saxophone, however Floyd calls the tune "saxomania."
- In Barb and Star Go to Vista Del Mar, the song is played during a montage.
