= Voobaha =

Studio album by Barnes & Barnes
- Released: August 1980
- Recorded: 1978–1980
- Studio: Lumania Studios
- Genres: Comedy rock, experimental
- Length: 44:20; 72:22 (Oglio Reissue)
- Labels: Rhino, Oglio, Collector's Choice
- Producers: Barnes & Barnes

Barnes & Barnes chronology
Voobaha (1980)	Spazchow (1981)

Professional ratings
Review scores
Source	Rating
AllMusic	4/5 stars

Voobaha is the debut album by novelty rock group Barnes & Barnes. It was originally released in 1980 by Rhino Records, reissued in 1996 by Oglio Records, and reissued again in 2006 by Collector's Choice. Its title means "greetings" in the band's artificial language of Lumanian.

Music videos were shot for the songs "Party in My Pants," "Fish Heads," and "When You Die," all of which were released on the home video compilation Zabagabee.

== Track listing ==
(All songs are by Barnes & Barnes, unless otherwise noted)

Side one

1. "Please Please Me" – (2:50) (Lennon–McCartney)
2. "Boogie Woogie Amputee" – (2:31)
3. "Gumby Jaws Lament" – (3:26)
4. "De Pumped Out Blues" – (2:26)
5. "Clip Clop (Ode To Equus)" – (3:53)
6. "I Hope She Dies" – (3:15)
7. "Party In My Pants" – (3:30)

Side two

1. "Fish Heads" – (2:23)
2. "Sewey Hole" – (2:49)
3. "The Lumanian Love Song" – (3:26)
4. "Cemetery Girls" – (4:30)
5. "Something's In The Bag" – (4:24)
6. "Linoleum" – (4:09)
7. "When You Die" – (0:48)

Both reissues contained additional bonus tracks:

Oglio Records (1996)

14. "The Vomit Song" – (1:55)
15. "Boogie Woogie Amputee" (1973 version) – (2:05)
16. "High School Gym" (featuring SuLu) – (2:13)
17. "Three Drunk Newts" – 3:05)
18. "Voyeur" – (3:55)
19. "Cruising Through Westwood" – (3:36)
20. "Neanderthal Love" – (2:57)
21. "Please Squeeze My Knees Louise" – (3:51)
22. "I Love You Baby" – (4:21)

Collector's Choice Records (2006)

14. "The Vomit Song" – (1:57)
15. "High School Gym" (featuring SuLu) – (2:17)
16. "Three Drunk Newts" – (3:09)
17. "Voyeur" – (3:56)
18. "Cruising Through Westwood" – (3:41)
19. "Neanderthal Love" – (3:02)
20. "Granny and the Kid" (from 2005) – (3:28)
21. "I Gotta Get a Fake I.D." (featuring SuLu, Musical Mike and Dr. Demento) – (3:08)
22. "High Heels and Cheese" – (5:05)
23. "Political Statement" (from 1975) – (0:48)
24. "Boogie Woogie Amputee "(1973 version) – (2:19)
25. "Fish Heads" (1976 version) – (1:26)

== Production ==
Barnes & Barnes – Producer, Engineer
Joan Farber – Design
Monica Froeber – Reissue Package Design
Rocky Schenck – Photography

== Trivia ==
The song "Cemetery Girls" features lyrics referencing ("Fresh souls in the cornfield...Anthony put them there..."), and samples from the Twilight Zone episode "It's a Good Life", which starred Bill Mumy (Art). Since the album was released several years before Art and Artie went "public" about their identities, the reference is more of an in-joke.

"Weird Al" Yankovic provided the accordion on "Gumby Jaws Lament". He also wrote some unused alternate lyrics that were adapted from a skit from his college radio show.

Artie (Robert Haimer) was originally to sing "Gumby Jaws Lament", but Art had a terrible cold that day, and they decided his gravelly, phlegmy voice added to the song. The coughing throughout the song is real.

Mook and Beanhead, mentioned in both "Party in my Pants" and "When You Die", were pet names for Art and Artie's recently (at the time) ex-girlfriends.

Posse, mentioned as the Lumanian phrase for "I love you" in "The Lumanian Love Song", was Artie's dog. Nicknames for several other people Art and Artie knew are also mentioned in the song (such as the aforementioned "Mook").
