= Sicks (album) =

Studio album by Barnes & Barnes
- Released: 1986; July 2005 (Reissue)
- Recorded: Lumania, 1985–1986
- Genre: Novelty rock
- Length: 39:24; 64:48 (Reissue)
- Label: Rhino Records; Oglio Records (Reissue)
- Producer: Barnes & Barnes; Bob Casale ("What's New Pussycat"); Gerry Beckley ("Blithering #2")

Barnes & Barnes chronology
| Amazing Adult Fantasy (1984) | Sicks (1986) | Zabagabee: The Best of Barnes & Barnes (1987) |

Professional ratings
Review scores
| Source | Rating |
|---|---|
| Allmusic | link |

Sicks is the fourth album released by novelty rock group Barnes & Barnes. It was originally released in 1986 by Rhino Records, and rereleased in 2005 by Oglio Records. Its title takes its name from the fact that it is their sixth non-single release (including their previous three albums and two EP's), and also that it was deliberately created as a "sick" album. A sticker on the shrinkwrap of the original LP read, "Warning! The sickest songs ever collected on one record."

== Track listing ==
All songs are by Barnes & Barnes, unless otherwise noted.

1. "If You Wanna Be Happy" (Guida/Guida/Royster)
2. "Homophobic Dream #22"
3. "Pussy Whipped" (Mumy/Haimer/Ferrer/Joliffe)
4. "Dead Baby Hunt"
5. "Pizza Face"
6. "Lick Lap"
7. "Scary Love"
8. "Pineapple Princess" (Sherman/Sherman)
9. "Sit on My Lap and Call Me Daddy"
10. "Baby Come Home"
11. "Love Button"
12. "Pre-School Games"
13. "Smelly Finger Blues"
14. "I Hate the Boss" (originally titled "I Got a Job")
15. "Auto Suck" (bonus track)
16. "I Married Mama" (bonus track)
17. "Worse Than Slime" (bonus track)
18. "Blithering #2" (bonus track)
19. The Ballad of Scott Ehrlich" (bonus track)
20. "I Had Sex With Santa" (bonus track)
21. "The Ballad of Hall and Oates" (bonus track)
22. "What's New Pussycat" (bonus track)
23. "Condomized" (bonus track)
24. "Vowels" (bonus track)
25. "When You Die #2" (bonus track)

== Trivia ==
1. The cover of the album is from the video of "Love Tap" from Spazchow.
2. "I Hate the Boss" was originally on the "lost" album Code of Honor, and was reworked for this album. It appears in its original form on Kodovoner
3. "Pussy Whipped" was co-written by actor Miguel Ferrer. It is through Bob and Bill's friendship with Miguel that got his father Jose Ferrer to appear in their video release Zabagabee.
4. Red Hot Chili Peppers bass guitarist, Flea, cameos in the "Pizza Face" music video as a pizza delivery man.
