= Edie and the Eggs =

US musical group

- Origin: United States
- Genres: Punk rock
- Past members: Edith Massey; Gina Schock; Ann Collier

Edie and the Eggs were a punk/comedy/celebrity-exploitation band featuring Edith Massey, known for acting in several films by John Waters, founded in 1978. The band's name referred to Massey's character in Pink Flamingos, who had an obsession with eating eggs and romanced an egg delivery man. Massey sometimes wore her bizarre leather costume from the film Female Trouble during gigs.

Edie and the Eggs included future Go-Go's drummer Gina Schock and Ann Collier, guitar player of Rhumboogie, a well-known all-female rock and roll band during 1974-78 from Baltimore. Ann Collier is the person who put the group Edith and the Eggs together after being asked to do so by John Waters.

They performed at CBGB and Max's Kansas City in New York City along with a few other engagements. Ann was asked by the Nuart Theatre in Los Angeles to bring the act out there for a number of shows. At that time Ann asked Edith, Gina Schock and Suzan Wirth (bass player) if they would like to go to California. The shows were mostly sold out and a hit; however, none of the members ever received any money for their efforts, with NetArt management saying they (the company) had overspent on the engagement. All the musicians returned to Baltimore. Edith Massey died a few years later; Gina Schock went back to California and joined the Go-Go's; and Suzan Wirth adopted a child and became a mother.

Ann Collier continued to play rock and roll music, and still does in Baltimore.

In 1982, Edie and the Eggs recorded a cover of The Four Seasons's "Big Girls Don't Cry", backed with "Punks, Get off the Grass", both of which were performed in The Eggs' punk stylings. The "Big Girls Don't Cry" cover was featured on the compilation album The Rhino Brothers Present the World's Worst Records shortly after the single's release. The song was later featured on the John Waters compilation, A Date with John Waters.

John Waters described Edie and the Eggs, particularly Massey, as "definitely a novelty act" and an "outsider artist".
