= Allen Cleveland Lewis =

- Born: 1821; Sterling, Connecticut, US
- Died: 1877 (aged 55–56); Chicago, Illinois, US

Allen Cleveland Lewis (1821–1877) was a Chicago citizen who left his estate in order to create the Lewis Institute.

== Biography ==
Allen Cleveland Lewis was born in Sterling, Connecticut. He lived in Elgin, Illinois as a young man, where he was a hardware merchant. He married and had one son. At the age of twenty months, his son died. After the death of his wife, Lewis moved to Chicago, Illinois.

Both Allen and his older brother John Lewis had an interest in creating a school for boys who had to leave school early to attend work. Allen traveled to Europe multiple times to study school systems before creating his will expressing his wish to form the Lewis Institute. In 1874, his older brother, John Lewis, died. He left Allen an estate of around $350,000. A majority of the estate was invested in railroad bonds. In the three years preceding his death he acquired an additional $200,000 to the estate he left after his death in 1877. Several pieces of property were transferred to him by another brother, Henry. The real estate had little value at the time, but 50 years later its value increased.

== Legacy ==
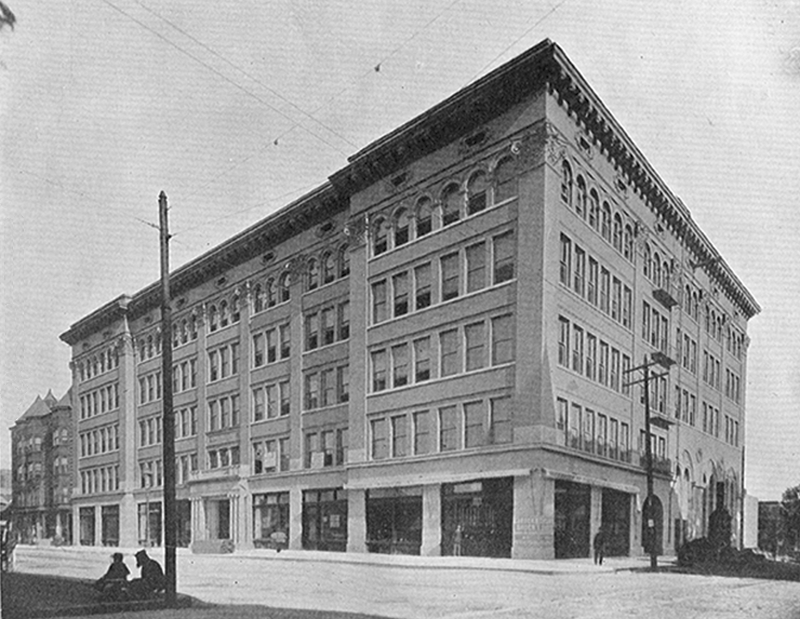
Lewis Institute ca. 1903

Allen's will stated that the estate must increase to $800,000 before the school was built. In 1895 Lewis Institute was opened. In those 18 years the estate had increased from $550,000 to $1,600,000. The will also stressed that the school taught "courses of a kind and character not generally taught in public schools... studies that would be directly useful to students in obtaining a position or occupation for life."

Under its first director, George Noble Carman, Lewis Institute initiated a four-year degree track. A two years associate degree program was also started. This made Lewis Institute the first junior college in the United States.

== See also ==
- Illinois Institute of Technology
