= Plainfield High School (Connecticut) =

Coordinates: 41.7287°N 71.9068°W

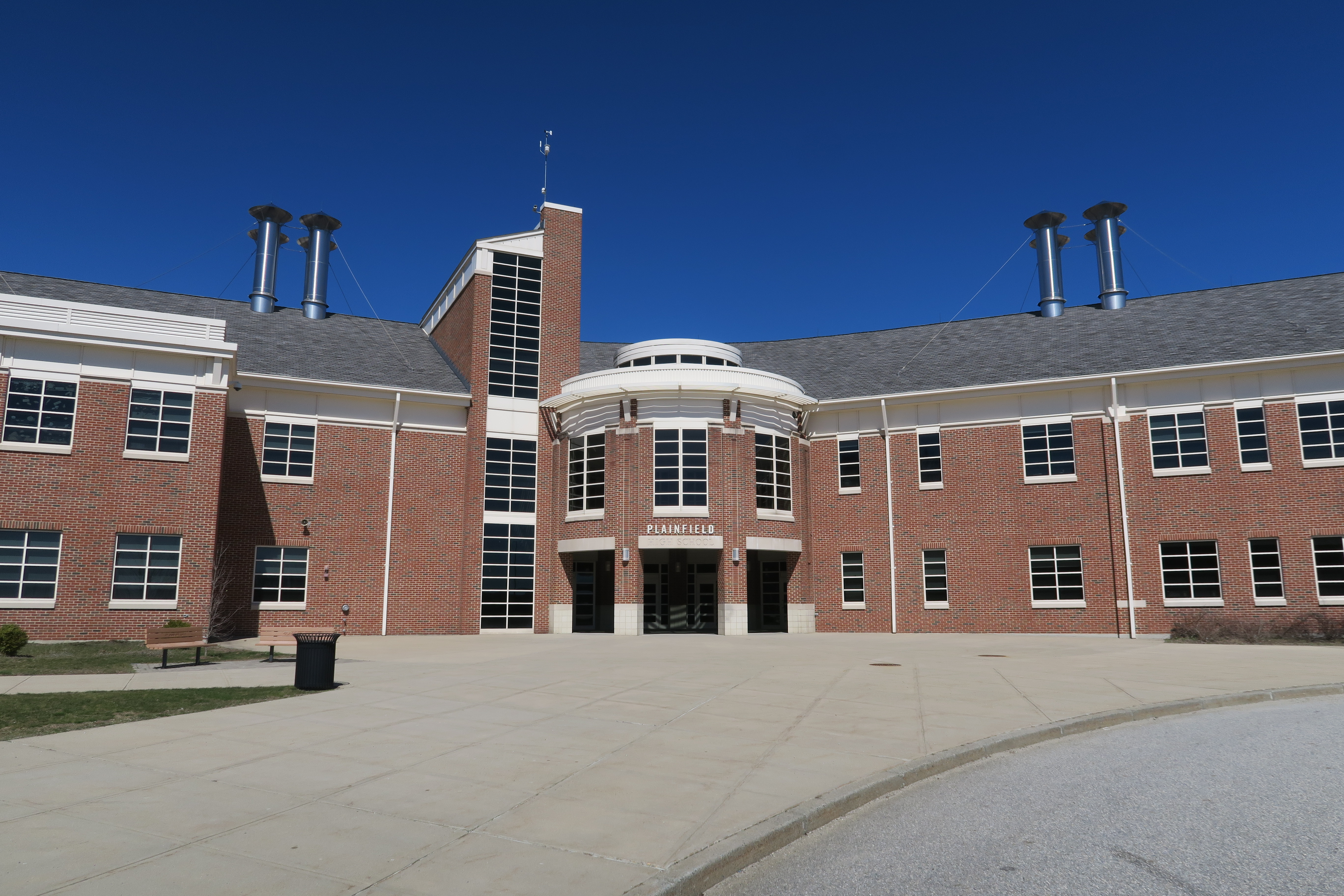

Location
- 105 Putnam Road; Central Village, Connecticut 06332; United States

Information
- CEEB code: 070090
- Enrollment: 507 (2023-2024)
- Colors: Orange and black
- Athletics conference: Eastern Connecticut Conference
- Team name: Panther
- Website: phs.plainfieldschools.org

Plainfield High School is an accredited school located in Central Village, Connecticut. It serves grades 9 through 12.

== History ==
In the spring of 1905, voters in the town of Plainfield established Plainfield High School to be located in a vacant room of the elementary school building in Central Village. The high school met in a room of "shared space in the Central Village Grammar School after the disbanding of Plainfield Academy and the state statute requiring towns to provide a public high school education to residents". The town hired John Lee Chapman, the former superintendent of schools in Chester, Massachusetts, to be the principal and superintendent of all schools in Plainfield. The Hartford Courant reported in August of that year that the state comptroller had approved a high school tuition appropriation of $1,093.50 for Plainfield.

Plainfield High School served 31 pupils in that first year, and 58 were enrolled in the second year of the school. The town also allocated $5,000 for an addition to the school building for the high school.

By the end of the high school's third year, a fourth year of the course of study was approved, to "provide and equip laboratories for physics and chemistry". There were four students in the first graduating class, and ten students in the class of 1910. By January 1911, the high school had sixty pupils, and the state board of education approved it to serve students from the towns of Canterbury, Sterling and Voluntown.

Graduating members from classes of 1908 through 1910 held a reunion at Superintendent Chapman's home, and established the school's alumni association. Plainfield High School's yearbook, The Hermiad, was first published in 1912, containing "egsays, poems and stories by pupils of the school, last will and testament of the class of '12".

In 1915, the curriculum included Latin, English, mathematics, German, bookkeeping, history, biology, physics and commercial geography, taught by a faculty of six, including Principal Chapman. That Fall, Chapman made the case publicly for a new building, citing crowded conditions as the school grew: "The need for a new building for the high school should be brought to the attention of the voters of the town and such action taken as will best serve the interests of all. To delay consideration of this question much longer is to lose ground already gained." By 1924, Plainfield High School moved into a new building, known as the Annex, which served until 2005, when the present building was constructed.

In 2003, the state had allocated $37.8 million toward the projected cost of the $48.9 million project projected for groundbreaking in April, to build "a two story, 170,850-square-foot high school, complete with 1,000-seat auditorium, several new athletic fields and a 1,200- seat stadium".

Groundbreaking was delayed with a projected completion date in Spring of 2005, "to meet the a New England Association of Schools and Colleges' deadline for addressing any remaining problems so the school can remain an accredited establishment". In August 2003, NEASC had placed Plainfield High School on probation.

School officials also responded in 2003 to reports of increased fighting with the explanation that the presence of a safety officer had increased the reporting of fights. Additionally, school board representatives of the town of Sterling raised "concerns stemming a from decreasing funding for education in Plainfield, particularly at the high school level", and what "extracurricular activities and classroom direction" Plainfield High School would offer Sterling students. Ultimately, officials from both towns celebrated together the groundbreaking for the new Plainfield-Sterling cooperative high school.

By February 2004, school officials had demonstrated progress toward meeting 52 accreditation recommendations, with remaining recommendations to be addressed when the new $48.9-million cooperative high school opened. That month, a new partnership between Plainfield High and Three Rivers Community College made a new technology program in photonics with college credits available to the high school's students. In August, freshmen students were the first to attend classes in the new building.

According to a feasibility study prepared in 2019 advocating that Plainfield High School Annex building should be repurposed, "The Annex is listed on the National Register of Historic Places as contributing to the Central Village Historic District, and is also listed individually on Connecticut's State Register of Historic Places." A 2022 newspaper article documented the condition of the Annex, concluding it was "near total collapse".

In 2025, the school district and the police department proposed to restore funds for a school safety officer which had been cut in the 2009-10 school year. The education budget of $39.3 million failed, along with the general government budget, which would have increased property owners' annual tax bills by about 3.6%.

== Curriculum ==
Plainfield High School offers college preparatory courses as well as some occupational courses, spanning grades 9–12.

Graduation requirements for 2025 include 25 credits, distributed to satisfy requirements in humanities, including civics and fine arts; STEM; physical education; health and safety education; world language; a mastery-based diploma assessment; and 3 additional credits in any department.
