= Sterling, Connecticut =

- Town
- Town of Sterling
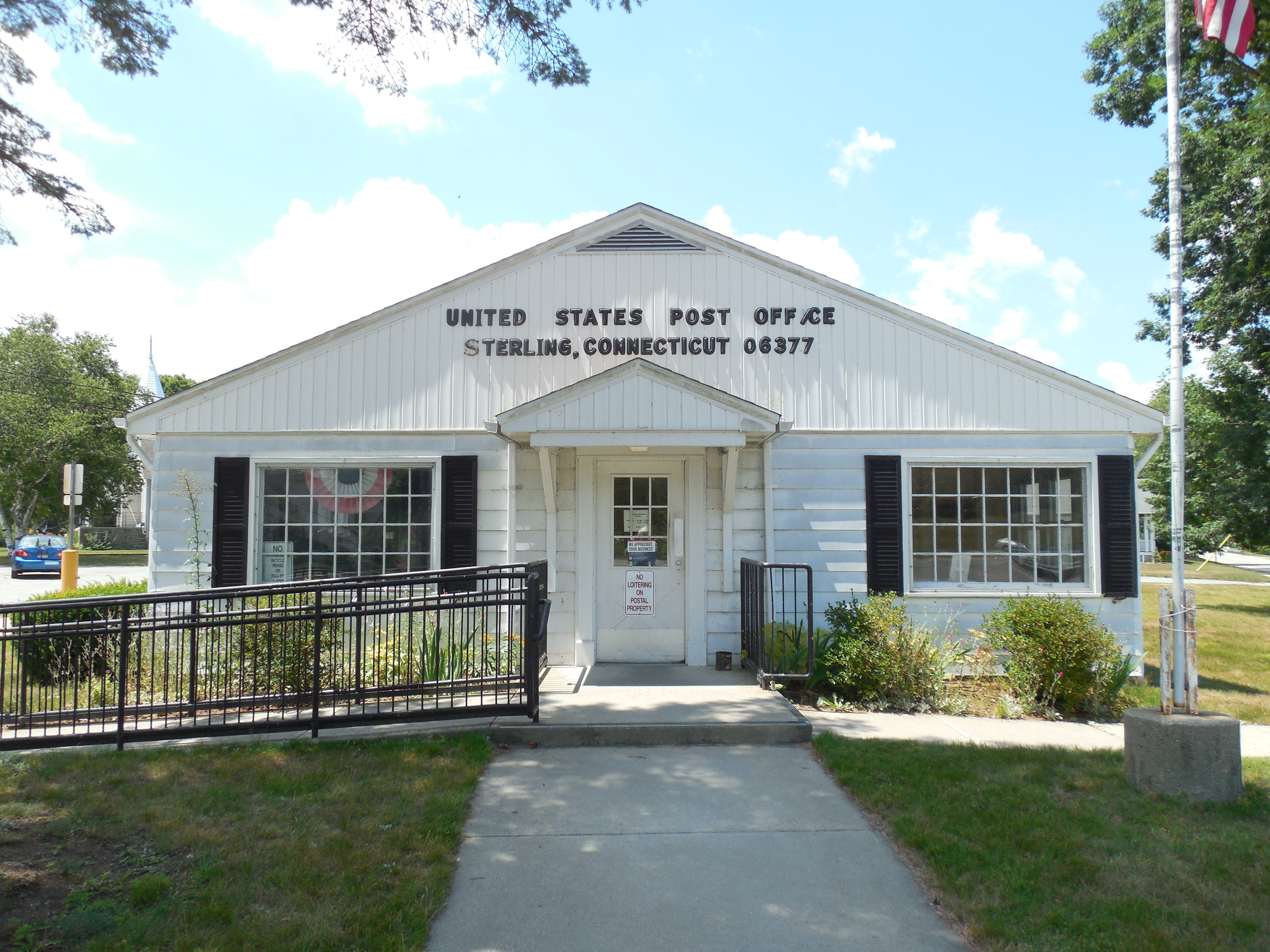
- Sterling's post office

- Seal

- Coordinates: 41°42′08″N 71°48′59″W
- Country: United States
- U.S. state: Connecticut
- County: Windham
- Region: Northeastern CT
- Incorporated: 1794

Government
  - Type: Selectman-town meeting
  - First selectman: Lincoln A. Cooper (R)
  - Selectman: John F. Firlik (D)

Area
  - Total: 27.3 sq mi (70.7 km^{2})
  - Land: 27.2 sq mi (70.5 km^{2})
  - Water: 0.077 sq mi (0.2 km^{2})
- Elevation: 384 ft (117 m)

Population (2020)
  - Total: 3,578
  - Density: 131/sq mi (50.8/km^{2})
- Time zone: UTC−5 (Eastern)
  - Summer (DST): UTC−4 (Eastern)
- ZIP code: 06377, 06373
- Area codes: 860/959
- FIPS code: 09-73420
- GNIS feature ID: 0213512
- Website: www.sterlingct.gov

Sterling is a town in Windham County, Connecticut, United States. The town is part of the Northeastern Connecticut Planning Region. The population was 3,578 at the 2020 census. The rural town is home to two villages: Oneco (named for Oneco, Sachem of the Mohegans) and Sterling village. Each contains a post office, a church, and a fire station. The town hall and public library are located in Oneco, and the town's one public school is in Sterling village.

== History ==
The town was named after John Sterling, an early settler. Sterling was incorporated in 1794 following approval of the state Assembly and was carved from northern part of the Town of Voluntown. Le Comte de Rochambeau, Jean Baptiste Donatien de Vimeur, marched through and camped in the town during the American Revolutionary War on his way from landing at Narragansett Bay to join George Washington's forces on the Hudson River in 1781. A cotton mill was first established in Sterling in 1800.

Charles Dow, of Dow Jones fame, was born in this community.

== Geography ==
According to the United States Census Bureau, the town has a total area of 27.3 square miles (71 km^{2}), of which 27.2 square miles (70 km^{2}) is land and 0.1 square miles (0.26 km^{2}) (0.29%) is water.

== Demographics ==
Historical population
Census	Pop.	Note	%±
1820	1,200		—
1850	1,025		—
1860	1,051		2.5%
1870	1,022		−2.8%
1880	957		−6.4%
1890	1,051		9.8%
1900	1,209		15.0%
1910	1,283		6.1%
1920	1,266		−1.3%
1930	1,233		−2.6%
1940	1,251		1.5%
1950	1,298		3.8%
1960	1,397		7.6%
1970	1,853		32.6%
1980	1,791		−3.3%
1990	2,357		31.6%
2000	3,099		31.5%
2010	3,830		23.6%
2020	3,578		−6.6%
U.S. Decennial Census

As of the census of 2000, there were 3,099 people, 1,116 households, and 835 families living in the town. Sterling's population increased 23.6% between 2000 and 2010, making it the third fastest-growing municipality in Connecticut that decade. The population density was 113.8 inhabitants per square mile (43.9/km^{2}). There were 1,193 housing units at an average density of 43.8 per square mile (16.9/km^{2}). The racial makeup of the town was 99.19% White, 0.71% Native American, 0.32% Asian, 0.03% Pacific Islander, 0.16% from other races, and 2.42% from two or more races. Hispanic or Latino people of any race were 1.32% of the population.

There were 1,116 households, out of which 40.2% had children under the age of 18 living with them, 60.7% were married couples living together, 8.4% had a female householder with no husband present, and 25.1% were non-families. 18.1% of all households were made up of individuals, and 5.6% had someone living alone who was 65 years of age or older. The average household size was 2.78 and the average family size was 3.15.

In the town, the population was spread out, with 28.1% under the age of 18, 7.6% from 18 to 24, 36.4% from 25 to 44, 20.4% from 45 to 64, and 7.5% who were 65 years of age or older. The median age was 34 years. For every 100 females, there were 104.6 males. For every 100 females age 18 and over, there were 107.2 males.

The median income for a household in the town was $49,167, and the median income for a family was $52,202. Males had a median income of $39,792 versus $26,167 for females. The per capita income for the town was $19,679. About 3.8% of families and 6.0% of the population were below the poverty line, including 4.3% of those under age 18 and 1.3% of those age 65 or over.

== Notable locations ==
- Dorrance Inn is a historic inn located at 748 Plainfield Pike and was added to the National Register of Historic Places in 2002.
- March Route of Rochambeau's Army: Plainfield Pike
- Sterling Hill Historic District (Plainfield and Sterling, Connecticut) was added to the National Register in 1986.

== Education ==
The town has operated the newer Sterling Community School, since the construction and closing of Sterling Memorial School. Plainfield High School in Plainfield is the designated high school of the town. Residents are also given the option to send their children to Killingly High School, Harvard H. Ellis Technical High School, Quinebaug Middle College or ACT High School.

== Notable people ==
- Charles Dow (1851–1902), journalist and founder of the Dow Jones & Company; born in Sterling
- Allen Cleveland Lewis (1821–1877), founder of the Lewis Institute (later the Illinois Institute of Technology); born in Sterling
- Tom "T-Bone" Stankus, musician

== In popular culture ==
The survival horror video game Faith: The Unholy Trinity is set in Sterling.
