= Dorrance Inn =

- U.S. National Register of Historic Places
- U.S. Historic district – Contributing property
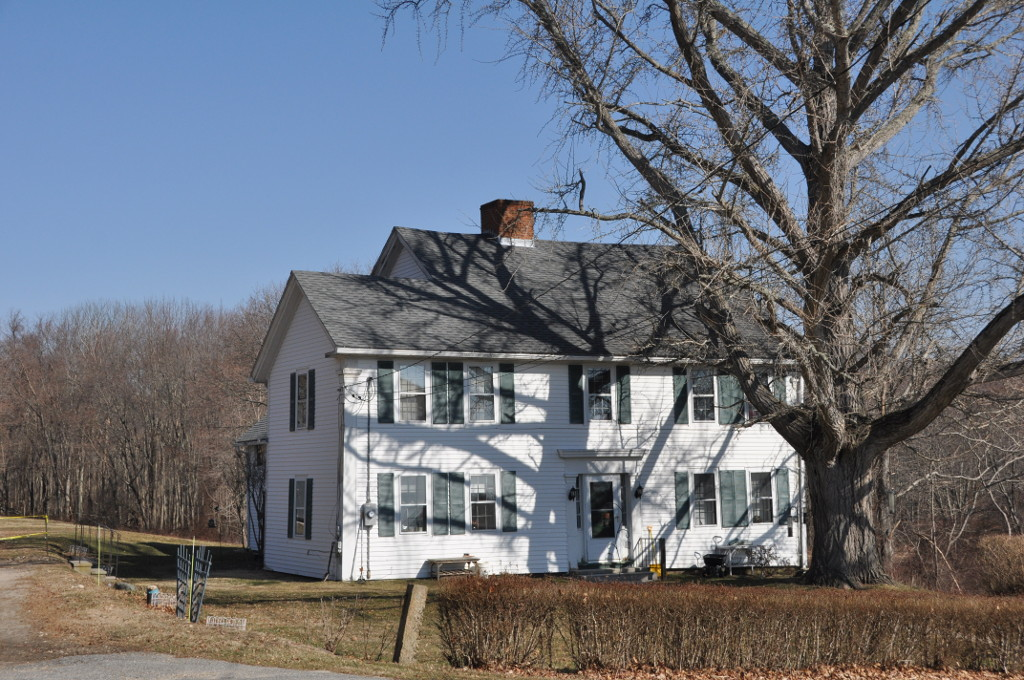

- Location within Connecticut Location within the United States
- Location: 748 Plainfield Pike, Sterling, Connecticut
- Coordinates: 41°41′29.4″N 71°50′45″W
- Area: 2 acres (0.81 ha)
- Architectural style: Colonial
- Part of: Sterling Hill Historic District (ID86000152)
- MPS: Rochambeau's Army in Connecticut, 1780-1782 MPS
- NRHP reference No.: 02000867

Significant dates
- Added to NRHP: August 23, 2002
- Designated CP: February 6, 1986

The Dorrance Inn, also known as the Samuel Dorrance House, was a historic former inn at 748 Plainfield Pike in Sterling, Connecticut, built about 1716. It was notable as a place that hosted officers of the French Army in 1781 and 1782, as it was along the march route taken by French commander Rochambeau's troops on their march to meet the Continental Army under General George Washington. Dorrance's Inn was one of a few places mentioned by name in multiple accounts written by French officers. The building was listed on the National Register of Historic Places in 2002 and was a contributing building in the Sterling Hill Historic District.

== Description and history ==
The former Dorrance Inn stood on the eastern edge of Sterling Hill's main village, just east of the Congregational Church on the north side of Plainfield Pike (Connecticut Route 14A). The road is a historically major east-west route through the town. The house was a 2 1/2-story wood-frame structure, five bays wide, with a side-gable roof and a large central chimney. The oldest portion of the house was built around 1716, consisting of the eastern three bays. Greek Revival treatments were added to the front door and house corners in the 19th century.

The house was the home and inn of Samuel Dorrance at the time of the American Revolutionary War, and is one of the few places mentioned by name in multiple French accounts of the army's 1781 and 1782 marches across Connecticut. Dorrance played host to the Marquis de Chastellux among others, and Rochambeau dined here on the return march in 1782. George Washington is also recorded as staying here in 1781. The inn lies along a well-preserved segment of Rochambeau's march route.

On July 27, 2026, the house was torn down by the present owner due to powder post beetle damage.

== See also ==
- March Route of Rochambeau's army
- List of historic sites preserved along Rochambeau's route
- National Register of Historic Places listings in Windham County, Connecticut
