= Loozanteen =

Studio album by Barnes & Barnes
- Released: October 1991
- Recorded: 1988–1991
- Genre: Novelty rock, pop rock
- Length: 53:54
- Label: Rhino
- Producer: Barnes & Barnes

Barnes & Barnes chronology
Zabagabee: The Best of Barnes & Barnes (1987)	Loozanteen (1991)	The Dinosaur Album: A Musical Adventure Through the Jurassic Age (1993)

Professional ratings
Review scores
Source	Rating
Allmusic	link

Loozanteen is the eighth album from novelty rock band Barnes & Barnes. It was released through Rhino Entertainment.

== Track listing ==
1. "Loozanteen"
2. "Fire In The Hole"
3. "The Invisible Maniac"
4. "What's It Like To Be You"
5. "Why Don't You Kill Me Now"
6. "Talk Line"
7. "Love Is So Noisy"
8. "Lovely In Loveland"
9. "Half"
10. "Homophobic Dream #23"
11. "Background Boy"
12. "Drinking With The Devil"
13. "Peg Leg Sue Got Married"
14. "Touch Yourself"
15. "Spanking Thru My Hard Times"
16. "Wax Your Carrot/The Boogie Man And Dan"
17. "I Love To Ride The Bus"
18. "I Feel Depressed"
