= March Route of Rochambeau's Army: Plainfield Pike =

- U.S. National Register of Historic Places
- U.S. Historic district
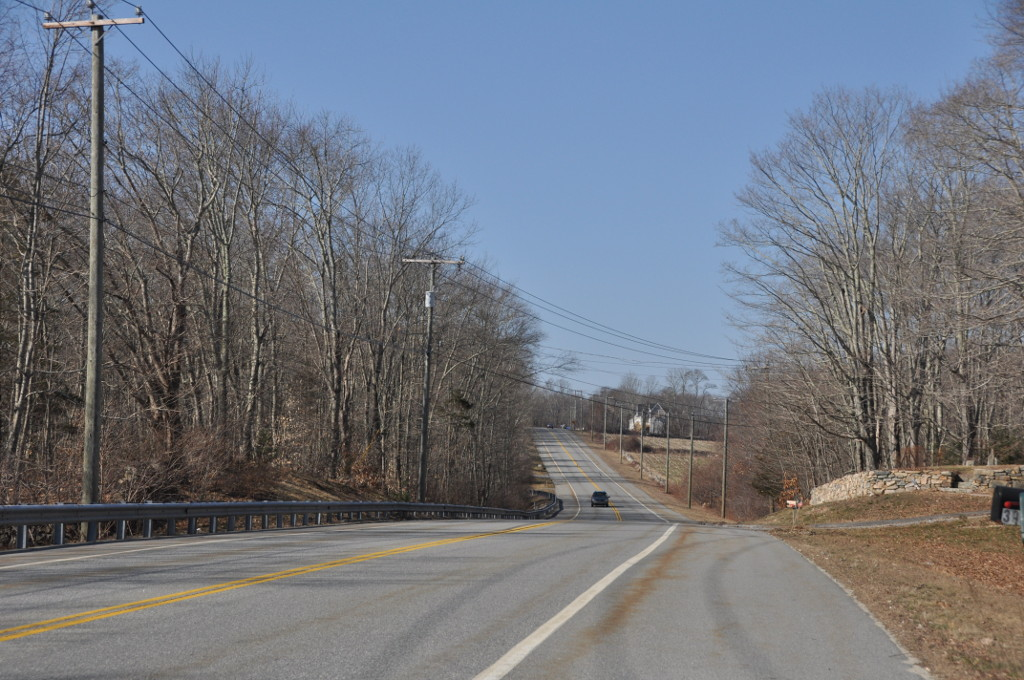
- the march route along Plainfield Pike in 2016

- Location within Connecticut Location within the United States
- Nearest city: Plainfield, Connecticut
- Coordinates: 41°40′54″N 71°51′50″W
- Area: 22 acres (8.9 ha)
- MPS: Rochambeau's Army in Connecticut, 1780-1782 MPS
- NRHP reference No.: 03000312

Significant dates
- Dates of significance: 1781, 1782
- Added to NRHP: June 6, 2003

March Route of Rochambeau's Army: Plainfield Pike is a 3.6 mile-long road segment in Plainfield and Sterling, Connecticut which forms a portion of the historic march route of Comte de Rochambeau's army in June 1781 on its way to Yorktown, Virginia, and again of the returning army in November 1782. It was listed on the National Register of Historic Places (NRHP) in 2003.

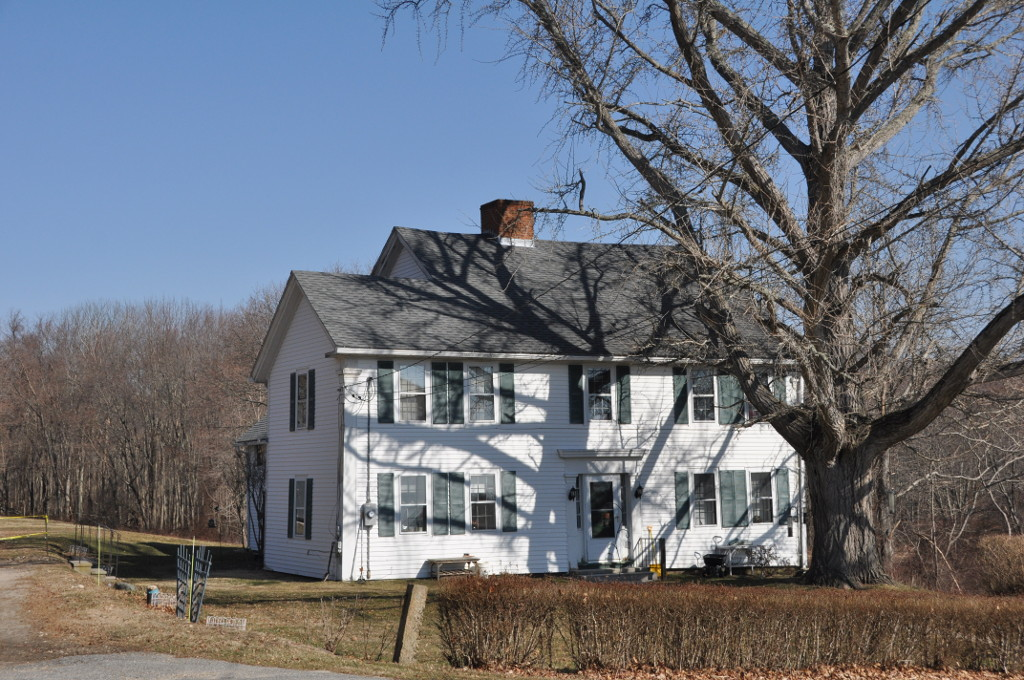
Dorrance Inn in 2016

It is a linear historic district consisting of a portion of Connecticut Route 14A, locally known as Plainfield Pike, which is level in the eastern part but generally hilly with curves. Along the route is open land of pasture and cornfields, wooded areas, and streams, including Ekonk Brook. It is bordered on both sides by stone walls about 50 feet apart for most of the way. As of 2002, the walls were clearly visible at some times of the year, although overgrown in places, but difficult to see in the summer. The only concentration of houses as of 2002 was of 18th- and 19th-century houses in the Sterling Hill Historic District section. Among these is the Dorrance Inn in Sterling (which was part of Voluntown at the time), which was mentioned in multiple French accounts of the marches and which is also NRHP-listed. The segment includes views of farm fields and other countryside suggestive of how the land would have appeared in 1781 and 1782 for the troops marching through, including views west to ridges on the west side of the Quinebaug River valley. According to the NRHP nomination for the district:

Although it is now a paved state highway, the road retains its narrow, hilly, winding character, and for most of its length, the characteristic borders of stone walls remain in place. This is the longest continuous portion of the route to survive with these physical attributes intact. This is also the only portion of the route that still offers repeated vistas of distant ridges (Photographs 3 and 4). Elsewhere, the route has been too affected by re-forestation to allow such views.

The area listed is the roadway owned by the Connecticut State Department of Transportation, and not the adjacent properties. In 1781, the roadway was poor, at least to the east of the hamlet of Plainfield just east of the listed district, and it caused difficulty for the artillery and baggage trains making their way to Plainfield from their second camp near Waterman's Tavern in Rhode Island. Frenchman Clermont-Crevecoeur's journal recorded: "very bad roads. The artillery and the supply wagons arrived very late" at the Plainfield camp. Von Closen agreed, "The roads were still very bad", as did du Bourg: "The roads still quite bad, many stragglers".

There are multiple other properties associated with Rochambeau's route that were also considered for listing on the National Register in a 2001 study.

== See also ==
- Washington–Rochambeau Revolutionary Route
- List of historic sites preserved along Rochambeau's route
