= The Three Chuckles =

- Origin: Brooklyn, New York
- Genres: Rock & roll
- Years active: 1949–1958
- Labels: Boulevard, RCA Victor
- Past members: Tommy Romano; Russ Gilberto; Phil Benti; Teddy Randazzo; Jackie Farrell

The Three Chuckles were an early American rock & roll group from Brooklyn, New York, United States.

Although designated rock & roll by contemporary observers, the sound of The Three Chuckles is closer to vocal pop, in hindsight. They formed in 1949, naming themselves after a popular candy of the day, and played East Coast establishments. Original accordionist/keyboardist Phil Benti left the group in the mid-1950s and was replaced with Teddy Randazzo, then a teenager. In 1954, they recorded a song called "Runaround", written by a truck driver named Cirino Colacrai, and released it on Boulevard Records as the B-side to "At Last You Understand". The single was picked up for national distribution by RCA Victor, and "Runaround" became a hit, peaking at No. 20 on the US national chart.

With their newfound fame, Randazzo became the lead singer and songwriter. They scored two further hits on the new Billboard charts: "Times Two, I Love You" (No. 67, 1955) and "And the Angels Sing" (No. 70, 1956). In 1956 the Three Chuckles performed the song "Cinnamon Sinner" in the movie, The Girl Can't Help It. Also in 1956, Alan Freed offered them a spot in his movie Rock, Rock, Rock; following this Randazzo left the group for a solo career. Jackie Farrell joined after Randazzo left, but the group did not return to record, and broke up by 1958. Randazzo recorded solo.

In 1997, Collectables Records issued a collection of Three Chuckles songs on CD.

Russ Gilberto (real name Thomas J. Gilberto) died on February 28, 1981, at the age of 60. Phil Benti (real name Philip Bentivegna) died in Nassau, New York, on January 10, 1983, at the age of 52. Teddy Randazzo died in Orlando, Florida on November 21, 2003, at the age of 68. Tommy Romano continued in the music industry, performing into the 1970s. He died on February 13, 2013, at the age of 84.

== Members ==
- Tommy Romano - vocals, guitar
- Tommy "Russ" Gilberto - vocals, bass
- Phil Benti - accordion
- Teddy Randazzo - accordion, vocals
- Jackie Farrell - accordion

== Album discography ==
- The Three Chuckles (RCA Victor, 1956), with Marty Gold and His Orchestra
- We're Gonna Rock Tonight (Patti, n.d.)

=== Compilation ===
- Golden Classics (Collectibles, 1997)
- Golden Oldies (Essential Media, n.d.)
