= Another One Rides the Bus (EP) =

EP by "Weird Al" Yankovic
- Released: 1981
- Recorded: April 1980 – January 1981
- Studio: KMET (Los Angeles); Richard Bennett's garage (Los Angeles)
- Genre: Comedy; parody
- Length: 9:28
- Label: Placebo
- Producer: "Weird Al" Yankovic

"Weird Al" Yankovic chronology
Another One Rides the Bus (1981)	"Weird Al" Yankovic (1983)

Singles from Another One Rides the Bus
- 1. "Another One Rides the Bus" Released: February 1981

Another One Rides the Bus is the debut extended play (EP) by American parodist "Weird Al" Yankovic. It was released in 1981 by Placebo Records. The title song is a parody of English rock band Queen's 1980 single "Another One Bites the Dust". The EP also features three other songs, all of which are original recordings. All four songs on Another One Rides the Bus later appeared on Yankovic's eponymous debut studio album; the three original songs were re-recorded for the album, while the title song is the same version that appears on the EP.

Another One Rides the Bus EP—of which only one thousand copies were made—was released to capitalize on the recent success of the titular parody. Yankovic borrowed money from Barret "Dr. Demento" Hansen to pay for the record, and he distributed them to records stores under consignment deals. Due to the underground success of this release, TK Records signed Yankovic and issued "Another One Rides the Bus" as a commercial single.

== Recording ==
The EP features the titular parody, as well as three original comedy songs, with music written by Yankovic. In April 1980, Yankovic recorded the first song for the album, "Gotta Boogie". The song, co-written by Joe Earley, is a play on words discussing a man with a "boogie" on his finger and his quandary therein. The second song to be recorded for the EP was "Another One Rides the Bus", on September 14, 1980. Yankovic wrote the song, a parody of Queen's hit "Another One Bites the Dust", and debuted it live on the Dr. Demento Show, hosted by Barret "Dr. Demento" Hansen. While practicing the song outside the sound booth, Yankovic met Jon "Bermuda" Schwartz who told Yankovic he was a drummer. Schwartz agreed to drum on Yankovic's accordion case to keep a steady beat to the song. "Another One Rides the Bus" became so popular that it landed Yankovic a short-lived record deal with TK Records and also led to his first appearance on a TV show, The Tomorrow Show with Tom Snyder. On the show, Yankovic played his accordion and Schwartz banged on Yankovic's accordion case and played the bulb horns.

In January 1981, the song "Mr. Frump in the Iron Lung" was recorded. The song, an audience favorite from Yankovic's days playing in coffeehouses at Cal Poly, describes the rather lopsided relationship between the narrator and the eponymous "Mr. Frump" in his iron lung, until the latter's death. The final song, recorded on January 19, 1981, was "Happy Birthday". A morbidly depressing birthday song detailing ails of the world, including poverty, nuclear holocaust, and eventual solar cataclysm, the song is based on the music of artist Tonio K. Only seeing two popular birthday songs at the time—"Happy Birthday to You" by Patty and Mildred J. Hill, and "Birthday" by The Beatles—Yankovic decided to write his own "severely twisted version of one". "Happy Birthday" was recorded in the garage of Richard Bennett, the brother of Schwartz who would go on to be a noted guitarist and record producer. All of the tracks, sans "Another One Rides the Bus", were recorded on a 4-track Portastudio; because only four tracks were available for mixing and recording, Yankovic had to carefully plan which parts of the songs he wanted to record at a time, and then mix them down before adding more song elements.

The EP's version of "Happy Birthday" is included on the Permanent Record: Al in the Box box set, and was remixed into stereo for the Hurricane Katrina charity album Laughter Is a Powerful Weapon Volume II. "Gotta Boogie", "Happy Birthday", and "Mr. Frump in the Iron Lung" were re-recorded for Yankovic's eponymous debut studio album, while "Another One Rides the Bus" was not.

== Release ==
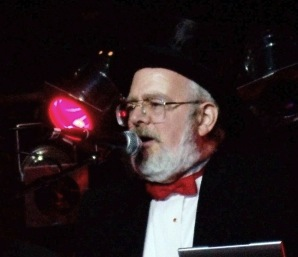
Yankovic borrowed money from Dr. Demento to press up one thousand copies of this EP.

Yankovic desired to release the song on a record label, although no label wanted to sign him at the time. Yankovic therefore borrowed some money from Dr. Demento and pressed up one thousand copies of the four-track EP by himself. Yankovic then distributed the EP to various record stores, selling them through consignment deals. Yankovic released the record under Placebo Records, a one-off label founded by Yankovic for the sole purpose of distributing the EPs. Due to the underground success of the release, Yankovic secured a short-lived record deal with TK Records, who issued the title song as a commercial single. Only one thousand copies of the Another One Rides the Bus EP were made, making it a rare record for modern collectors.

== Track listing ==
Side one
No.	Title	Writer(s)	Parody of	Length
1.	"Another One Rides the Bus"	John Deacon, Alfred Yankovic	"Another One Bites the Dust" by Queen	2:36
2.	"Happy Birthday"	Yankovic	Style parody of Tonio K	2:36

Side two
No.	Title	Writer(s)	Parody of	Length
1.	"Gotta Boogie"	Yankovic, Joe Earley	Original	2:21
2.	"Mr. Frump in the Iron Lung"	Yankovic	Original	1:55

== Personnel ==
Credits adapted from EP liner notes, except where noted.

Musicians

- "Weird Al" Yankovic – accordion, lead vocals; thumps (track 3)
- Damaskas (Dan Hollombe) – background vocals (tracks 1, 2, 3)
- Jon "Bermuda" Schwartz – accordion case (track 1), drums (track 2), background vocals (track 2)
- Musical Mike (Mike Kieffer) – hand music (track 1), background vocals (track 2)
- Sulu (Sue Lubin) – hand music (tracks 1, 3)
- Beefalo Bill (Bill Burk) – "miscellaneous insanities" (track 1)
- Tohm – "miscellaneous insanities" (tracks 1, 3)
- Jeri – "miscellaneous insanities" (tracks 1, 3)
- Bobcat Bennett – guitar (track 2)
- Frank (From the Bank) Sanchez – bass guitar (track 2)
- Kamikaze Coco – background vocals (track 2)
- BEH (Barry Hansen) – background vocals (track 2)
- Jammin' Joel Miller – bongos
- Leroy Finklestein – "choreography"
- Madman Mike Solton – background vocals (track 3)
- Tegan – background vocals (track 3)
- Rick Turner – "gaffer and key grip"

Technical

- Beefalo Bill – sleeve design
