= Tom "T-Bone" Stankus =

American musician

Tom "T-Bone" Stankus is an American musician based in Bristol, Connecticut. He is known for performing comedic stylings with his acoustic guitar. Most of his songs and programs are geared towards children. He is most noted for his song "Existential Blues," which heavily references the 1939 Wizard of Oz movie and was featured on the Dr. Demento: 20th Anniversary Collection.

He is known to his audiences as "America's Musical Pied Piper", and has been entertaining full-time since 1978. He performs several different themed shows that encourage audience participation, including "T-Bone's Camp Muckalucka", which recounts an imaginary day at a camp, and includes story time, beach balls and campfire singalongs.

== Biography ==
Stankus is originally from Sterling, Connecticut. From 1972 to 1977 he taught in the Wolcott, Connecticut, public schools, and was a part-time entertainer. He said, "One day I looked at my situation and discovered I was making more money on the side than I was teaching. So I went into it full time." He toured New England and performed nightly for many summers. In the winters, he sometimes toured in Florida, but mostly worked in libraries, offices, DMV facilities, pubs, schools and theaters.
