= Sterling Hill Historic District (Plainfield and Sterling, Connecticut) =

Historic district in Connecticut, United States

- U.S. National Register of Historic Places
- U.S. Historic district
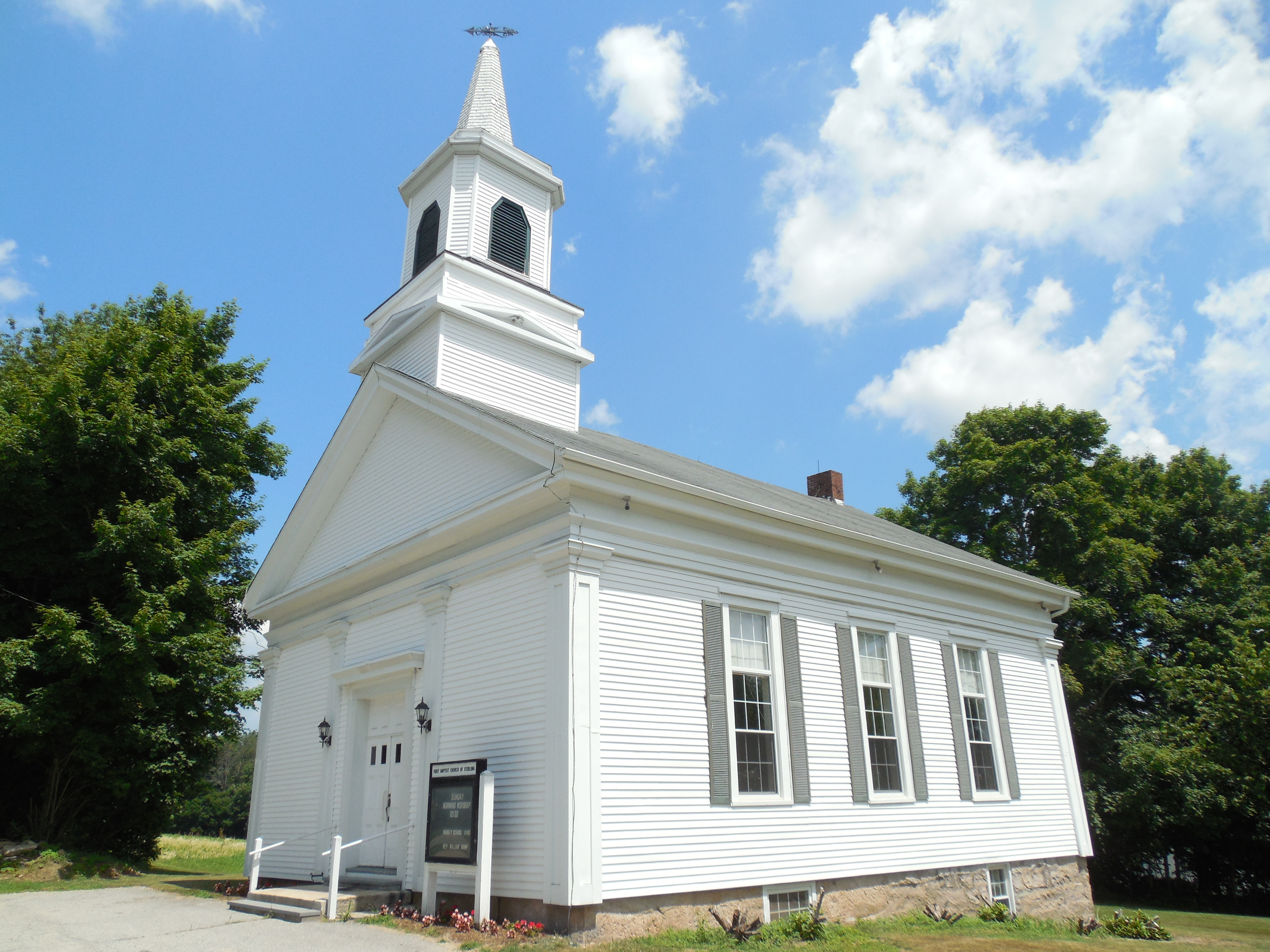
- First Baptist Church of Sterling

- Location within Connecticut Location within the United States
- Location: Sterling Hill Road and CT 14A, Plainfield and Sterling, Connecticut
- Coordinates: 41°41′23″N 71°50′56″W
- Area: 25 acres (10 ha)
- Architectural style: Greek Revival, Italianate, Federal
- NRHP reference No.: 86000152
- Added to NRHP: February 6, 1986

The Sterling Hill Historic District encompasses a well-preserved early 19th-century rural village center on western edge of the town of Sterling, Connecticut. Centered at the junction of Plainfield Pike (Connecticut Route 14A) and Sterling Hill Road, it consists of a cluster of 19th and early 19th-century houses, and a church. Unlike other period villages, it has largely been unaffected by later development. It was listed on the National Register of Historic Places in 1986.

== Description and history ==
The Sterling Hill area was settled in the early 18th century, and was originally incorporated as part of Voluntown. It remained a sparsely populated area through the 18th century, and was separately incorporated in 1794. By this time, Plainfield Pike had become a major east-west road between Providence, Rhode Island and Hartford, Connecticut, with a small cluster of homes and taverns. Upon incorporation, the new town had no defined center and no church. The town voted in 1797 to build a town hall, which in 1812 was made available to a Baptist congregation for religious use. This is the present Sterling Hill Baptist Church, which was given Greek Revival styling in 1859. The village center was entirely bypassed by industrial development in the 19th century, and by the railroad, which passed no closer than Plainfield to the west.

The historic district is centered around the junctions of Plainfield Pike with Sterling Hill Road (which leads north) and Connecticut Route 49 (which leads south). In addition to the church, the district includes 14 older and newer houses that include Greek Revival, Italianate, and Federal architecture. The Dorrance Homestead (c.1716) is a combination of original house to the right of its large chimney, plus a later addition to the left which includes a Greek Revival entry. One house, located at the western edge of the district, extends into Plainfield.

A portion of the Plainfield Pike running through the village is also historically significant as the travel route of the French Army during the Revolutionary War. The French camped overnight in Sterling Hill, both in 1781 and in 1782.

== See also ==
- National Register of Historic Places listings in Windham County, Connecticut
- List of historic sites preserved along Rochambeau's route
