= The Playmates =

American late 50s vocal group

The "Beep Beep" record cover

The Playmates were an American late 1950s vocal group led by the pianist Chic Hetti (born Carl Cicchetti, 26 February 1930), drummer Donny Conn (born Donald Claps, 29 March 1930 – September 2, 2015), and Morey Carr (31 July 1932 – 1987), all from Waterbury, Connecticut, United States.

== Career ==
The Playmates—Donald Claps (a.k.a. Donny Conn), drummer and lyricist; Carl Cicchetti (a.k.a. Chic Hetti), pianist music composer; and Morey Cohen (a.k.a. Morey Carr), lead vocalist—were an instrumental and vocal trio, from Waterbury, Connecticut, and, in the early 1950s, at the University of Connecticut. After graduation in 1952, they began touring small lounges and night clubs in the United States and Canada, originally as "the Nitwits", later as the Playmates.

Signed to Roulette Records in 1958 as the label's first vocal group, and anticipating a Calypso craze, the group recorded an album called Playmates Visit the West Indies. They then released two notable Top 40 singles—"Jo-Ann" and "Don't Go Home"—before having a number 4 hit (July 9, 1958) with the tempo-changing novelty song "Beep Beep", which became a regular feature for Dr. Demento.

"Beep Beep" was on the Billboard Top 40 chart for twelve weeks. It sold more than one million copies, and was awarded a gold disc. Concurrently with the popularity of "Beep Beep", American Motors Corporation (AMC) was setting production and sales records for the Rambler models. Because of a directive by the BBC at the time that songs did not include brand names in their lyrics, a version of "Beep Beep" was recorded for the European market, replacing the Cadillac and Nash Rambler with the generic terms limousine and bubble car.

The group followed up with a chart listing single in 1959 with "What Is Love" and then again in 1960 with "Wait For Me". After four albums for Roulette, the novelty group—known for its between-song comedy and banter as much for its repertoire—broke up in 1965. Morey Carr died from lung cancer in 1987. Donald Claps died in Malibu, California, on September 2, 2015, at the age of 85.

== Discography ==
=== Singles ===
| Year | Title | Peak chart positions | | Record Label | B-side | Album |
| Year | Title | US Pop | CAN CHUM | Record Label | B-side | Album |
|---|---|---|---|---|---|---|
| 1956 | "Nickelodeon Rag" | — | — | Rainbow | "I Have Only Myself to Blame" | |
| 1957 | "Pretty Woman" | — | — | Roulette | "Barefoot Girl" | Calypso With the Playmates |
| 1957 | "Darling It's Wonderful" | — | 12 | Roulette | "Island Girl" | At Play With the Playmates |
| 1957 | "Jo-Ann" | 19 | 6 | Roulette | "You Can't Stop Me From Dreaming" | At Play With the Playmates |
| 1958 | "Let's Be Lovers" | 87 | 38 | Roulette | "Give Me Another Chance" (No. 49 CAN) | |
| 1958 | "Don't Go Home" | 22 | 8 | Roulette | "Can't You Get It Through Your Head" | At Play With the Playmates |
| 1958 | "The Day I Died" | 81 | — | Roulette | "While the Record Goes Around" | At Play With the Playmates |
| 1958 | "Beep Beep" | 4 | 2 | Roulette | "Your Love" | At Play With the Playmates |
| 1959 | "Star Love" | 75 | — | Roulette | "The Thing-a-ma-jig" | |
| 1959 | "What Is Love?" | 15 | 15 | Roulette | "I Am" | Wait for Me and Other Outstanding Hits |
| 1959 | "First Love" | — | — | Roulette | "A Ciu-è" | Wait for Me and Other Outstanding Hits |
| 1959 | "On the Beach" | — | — | Roulette | "The Song Everybody's Singing" | Wait for Me and Other Outstanding Hits |
| 1960 | "Second Chance" | — | — | Roulette | "These Things I Offer You" | Wait for Me and Other Outstanding Hits |
| 1960 | "Parade of Pretty Girls" | — | — | Roulette | "Our Wedding Day" | Wait for Me and Other Outstanding Hits |
| 1960 | "Wait for Me" | 37 | 19 | Roulette | "Eyes of an Angel" | Wait for Me and Other Outstanding Hits |
| 1961 | "Little Miss Stuck-Up" | 70 | 47 | Roulette | "Real Life" | |
| 1961 | "Tell Me What She Said" | — | — | Roulette | "Cowboys Never Cry" | |
| 1961 | "Wimoweh" | — | — | Roulette | "One Little Kiss" | |
| 1962 | "A Rose and a Star" | — | — | Roulette | "Bachelor Flat" | |
| 1962 | "Keep Your Hands in Your Pockets" | 88 | — | Roulette | "The Cop on the Beat" | |
| 1962 | "What a Funny Way to Show It" | — | — | Roulette | "Petticoats Fly" | |
| 1963 | ""A" My Name Is Alice" | — | — | ABC-Paramount | "Just a Little Bit" | |
| 1963 | "She Never Looked Better" | — | — | ABC-Paramount | "But Not Through Tears" | |
| 1963 | "I Cross My Fingers" | — | — | ABC-Paramount | "I'll Never Get Over You" | |
| 1964 | "The Only Guy Left on the Corner" | — | — | ABC-Paramount | "The Guy Behind the Wheel" | |
| 1964 | "Fiddler on the Roof" | — | — | Colpix | "A Piece of the Sky" | |
| 1965 | "One by One the Roses Died (Motive D'Amore)" | — | — | Colpix | "Spanish Perfume (And a Yellow Rose)" | |
| 1965 | "The Ballad of Stanley the Lifeguard" | — | — | Congress | "Should I Ask Someone Else to Tell Her" | |
| 1971 | "Dayeynu (That Would Be Enough for Me)" | — | — | Bell | "Foundation of Love" | |

At Play with the Playmates

Studio album by The Playmates
- Released: 1958
- Recorded: 1958
- Genre: Novelty
- Label: Roulette
- Producer: Hugo Peretti

Singles from At Play with the Playmates
- 1. "Darling It's Wonderful" Released: September 1957; 2. "Jo-Ann" Released: December 1957; 3. "Don't Go Home" Released: April 1958; 4. "The Day I Died" Released: August 1958; 5. "Beep Beep" Released: October 1958

Album

- At Play with the Playmates (1958)

Side one

1. "Jo-Ann" – 2:35
2. "Your Love" – 2:09
3. "Darling It's Wonderful" – 2:35
4. "Substitute for Love" – 2:13
5. "Magic Shoes" – 2:10
6. "While the Record Goes Around" – 2:10

Side two

1. "Beep Beep" – 3:01
2. "The Day I Died" – 2:20
3. "Give Me Another Chance" – 2:25
4. "Lovable" – 2:16
5. "Intimate" – 2:20
6. "Don't Go Home" – 2:30
