= Little Roger and the Goosebumps =

Pop/rock band from San Francisco

- Genres: Pop music, Comedy music
- Years active: 1973–1983, 2006
- Members: Roger Clark; Dick Bright

Little Roger and the Goosebumps is a pop/rock band from San Francisco active during the 1970s and early 1980s and resurrected in 2006. It has been led throughout its history by Roger Clark and Dick Bright, with various sidemen.

The band is best known for its single "Gilligan's Island (Stairway)" a song combining the lyrics to the theme song of the television show Gilligan's Island with the music of "Stairway to Heaven" by Led Zeppelin. The band wrote the song in 1977 as "material to pad the last set of the grueling 5 nights a week/4 sets a night routine," recorded it in March 1978, and released it as a single in May 1978 on their own Splash Records label. Led Zeppelin's management threatened a copyright infringement lawsuit against the label, its attorneys demanding that all copies be destroyed, and the band withdrew the song, seeing their legal resources as inadequate. The song was reissued in 2000 on the CD Laguna Tunes with the song title renamed "Stairway to Gilligan's Island."

In 1980 they released their Christmas single "Xmas in the Hot Tub".

During a 2004 interview on National Public Radio, Robert Plant referred to the tune as his favorite cover of "Stairway to Heaven."

The famous conman "Clark Rockefeller" and his young daughter Snooks used to sing the Stairway/Gilligan's mix.

The band recorded their next single, "Kennedy Girl" (based on Neil Young's "Cinnamon Girl"), in 1980, then waited over a quarter-century before producing their debut album They Hate Us Cuz We're Beautiful, featuring new recordings of 14 songs drawn from three decades of original material.

Their single "Fudd on the Hill," essentially a performance of "Fool on the Hill" by Looney Tunes character Elmer Fudd, was included on the novelty compilation album The Rhino Brothers Present the World's Worst Records, Volume 2.
