= Nervous Norvus =

American musician (1912–1968)

Jimmy Drake
- Born: March 24, 1912; Memphis, Tennessee, U.S.
- Died: July 24, 1968 (aged 56) Alameda County, California, U.S.
- Occupation: Musician

Jimmy Drake (March 24, 1912 – July 24, 1968), known professionally as Nervous Norvus, was an American musician known for the controversial novelty song "Transfusion".

== Early life ==
Jimmy Drake was born in Memphis, Tennessee, and lived for a few years in Ripley, Tennessee. Because of his chronic asthma, Drake and his family moved to California when he was seven, eventually settling in East Hollywood, Los Angeles.

== Career ==
Drake moved to Oakland, California when he was 29, and he lived there for the rest of his life. In 1953, while working as a truck driver, Drake became active in the recording industry. He bought an Ampex 600 reel-to-reel tape recorder, a second-hand piano, and a baritone ukulele. With these accessories, Drake supplemented his truck-driving income in earnest by recording demos of his fellow amateur songwriters’ offerings.

Drake's novelty song "Transfusion", recorded for the Dot Records label, was a top-ten hit in May 1956, reaching number 8 on the Billboard Best Sellers chart. A second single, "Ape Call", released in July of that year, also charted and peaked at number 28. A third Dot single, "The Fang", released in September 1956, did not chart.

The lyrics in "Transfusion" concern a reckless driver who repeatedly gets seriously injured in car accidents by disregarding traffic laws (speeding, unsafe lane changes, and disregarding stop signs); he vows to never speed again after each accident, but quickly goes back to his dangerous driving habits after asking for (and receiving) a blood transfusion each time. This novelty song features the sound effects of a vehicle collision. The song was banned on many radio stations in the 1950s. The song was later played on the radio by Barry Hansen, which led to Hansen's nickname Dr. Demento.

== Death ==
Drake died at age 56 in Alameda County, California of cirrhosis. His body was donated to the University of California, San Francisco, Anatomy Department.
