= Beep Beep (song) =

1958 novelty song by The Playmates

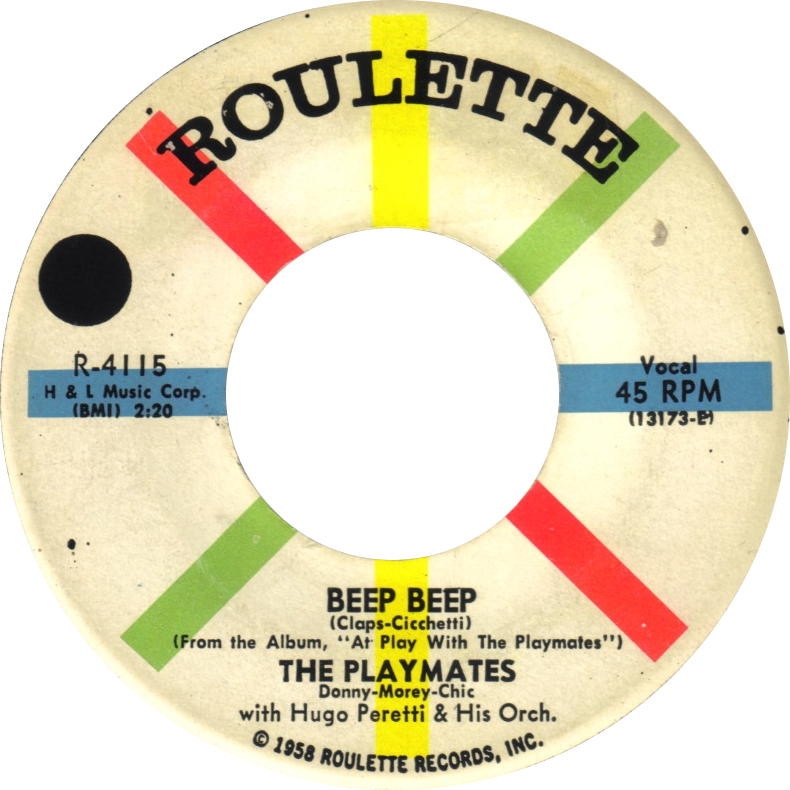
- A 1958 single of "Beep Beep"

Single by The Playmates

from the album At Play with The Playmates
- A-side: "Your Love"
- Released: 1958
- Genre: Novelty
- Length: 3:04 (album); 2:20 (single)
- Label: Roulette
- Songwriters: Carl Cicchetti; Donald Claps

The Playmates singles chronology
"While the Record Goes Around" (1958)	"Beep Beep" (1958)	"Star Love" (1959)

"Beep Beep" is a novelty song written and recorded by The Playmates, originally released in 1958 by Roulette Records on the album At Play with The Playmates, and later as a single—the B-side to "Your Love". The song describes an unintended street race between two mismatched cars (a Cadillac and Nash Rambler) and charted with Billboard for 15 weeks, peaking at number four.

== Composition ==
"Beep Beep" was written by Carl Cicchetti and Donald Claps, also known as Chic Hetti and Donny Conn, the band's arranger/pianist and drummer, respectively. It was written for their live performances, before any record deals.

The song is built around accelerando: the tempo of the song gradually increases commensurate with the increasing speed of the drivers. In his book The Guide to United States Popular Culture, Ray B. Browne lists "Beep Beep" as an example of "motoring music [...] in the chase mode". It is a tortoise-and-the-hare race, substituting the drivers of two unequal cars, originally a Nash Rambler and Cadillac, respectively. The instruments used in "Beep Beep" were bass, drums, guitar, piano, and an "old rubber-bulb horn for the 'beeps'".

== Release ==
Some of the songs on the 1958 Playmates' album At Play with The Playmates, had already been released as singles, while some were recorded specifically for the LP—"Beep Beep" was one of these, at 3:04 long.

Roulette Records did not want to release "Beep Beep" as a single, because the song changed tempo, it explicitly named contemporary products on the market, and was not danceable. When disc jockeys began playing it off the album, it forced the label's hand, and Roulette released it as a 45 single (catalog number 4115): the B-side to "Your Love", coming in at 2:20 long.

Because of a contemporary BBC directive that prohibited songs with brand names in their lyrics, a version of "Beep Beep" was recorded for the European market, replacing the Cadillac and Nash Rambler with the generic terms limousine and bubble car; this recut version was also released in the US for radio stations with similar policies about product placement.

== Reception ==
"Beep Beep" began charting with Billboard on November 3, 1958; it charted for 15 weeks, peaking at number four. After the single sold one million copies, the Recording Industry Association of America awarded it the only gold disc of the Playmates' career. The Playmates were scheduled to perform their song on the December 3, 1958 episode of The Milton Berle Show.

In December 1958, Time credited the popularity of "Beep Beep" with helping American Motors Corporation break sales records. In November 1958, the company doubled its previous year's production record with 26,782 cars; Ramblers accounted for 9.2% of October 1958's automobile sales in the United States; and though "total U.S. exports slid 16% in 1958, Rambler's climbed 10.3%". "Beep Beep" was also popular with the workers building Ramblers on AMC's assembly lines in Kenosha, Wisconsin.

== See also ==
- "409" (song) – 1962 single by The Beach Boys
- "GTO" (Ronny & the Daytonas song) – 1964 single
- "Hey Little Cobra" – 1963 single by The Rip Chords
- "Shut Down" (The Beach Boys song) – 1963 song
