= Spazchow =

Studio album by Barnes & Barnes
- Released: November 1981; October 1997 (reissue)
- Recorded: 1980–1981
- Genre: Comedy rock, comedy, experimental
- Length: 45:14; 75:33 (reissue)
- Label: Rhino Records; Oglio Records (reissue)
- Producer: Barnes & Barnes; Bill Mumy (bonus tracks "Mook E Bare" and "The Longest Dream"); Robert Haimer (bonus tracks "I Killed Her With Love" and "Love Won't Save Me")

Barnes & Barnes chronology
| Voobaha (1980) | Spazchow (1981) | I Had Sex With E.T. (1982) |

Professional ratings
Review scores
| Source | Rating |
|---|---|
| Allmusic | 3/5 stars |

Spazchow is the title of the second album of American comedy rock group Barnes & Barnes, originally released in 1981 by Rhino Records and re-released in 1997 by Oglio Records.

== Origins ==
The title means "born to suffer at the hands of women and make music" (revealed when the first track, "Intro", is played backward) in the duo's artificial language of Lumanian. The theme of "suffering at the hands of women" is present throughout many of the tracks on the album, giving it a slightly more serious tone than their first album, Voobaha. Many of the songs are connected by themed "links" that tie the album together, and for the 1997 release the links were given titles (or "links") for the album's reissue, and some were created for the album's bonus music.

== Track listing ==
(All songs are by Barnes & Barnes, unless otherwise noted)

Side one

1. "Intro" — (0:17)
2. "I Need You" — (2:27) (Gerry Beckley)
3. "Spooky Lady On Death Avenue" — (3:18)
4. "Fletchy's Revenge" — (3:14)
5. "Love Tap" — (2:41)
6. "Cats" — (3:11)
7. "For You" — (1:55)
8. "Where's The Water" — (4:24)

Side two

1. "Swallow My Love" — (3:07)
2. "And Other Things Too (E's Epistle)" — (2:07)
3. "Slut" — (4:04)
4. "Roadblock" — (3:58)
5. "Unfinished Business" — (3:42)
6. "The Inevitable Song" — (2:47)
7. "Heart Ghosts" — (1:40)

The 1997 reissue contains additional bonus tracks:

16. "The Boogie Man"
17. "Women Rattle Me"
18. "I Killed Her With Love"
19. "Bloodless Nights"
20. "Mook E Bare"
21. "The Longest Dream"
22. "Love Won't Save Me"
23. "Passively Vicious"

== Trivia ==
- "And Other Things Too (E's Epistle)" was written by Mumy as an apology/plea to return to his then girlfriend Eileen. They eventually reconciled and they married, and had two children.
- The song "Love Tap" was made into a short film by Rocky Schneck (later released on the video compilation Zabagabee) and featured then-unknown actor Bill Paxton and actress Annerose Bucklers.
