= Wild Man Fischer =

American musician (1944–2011)

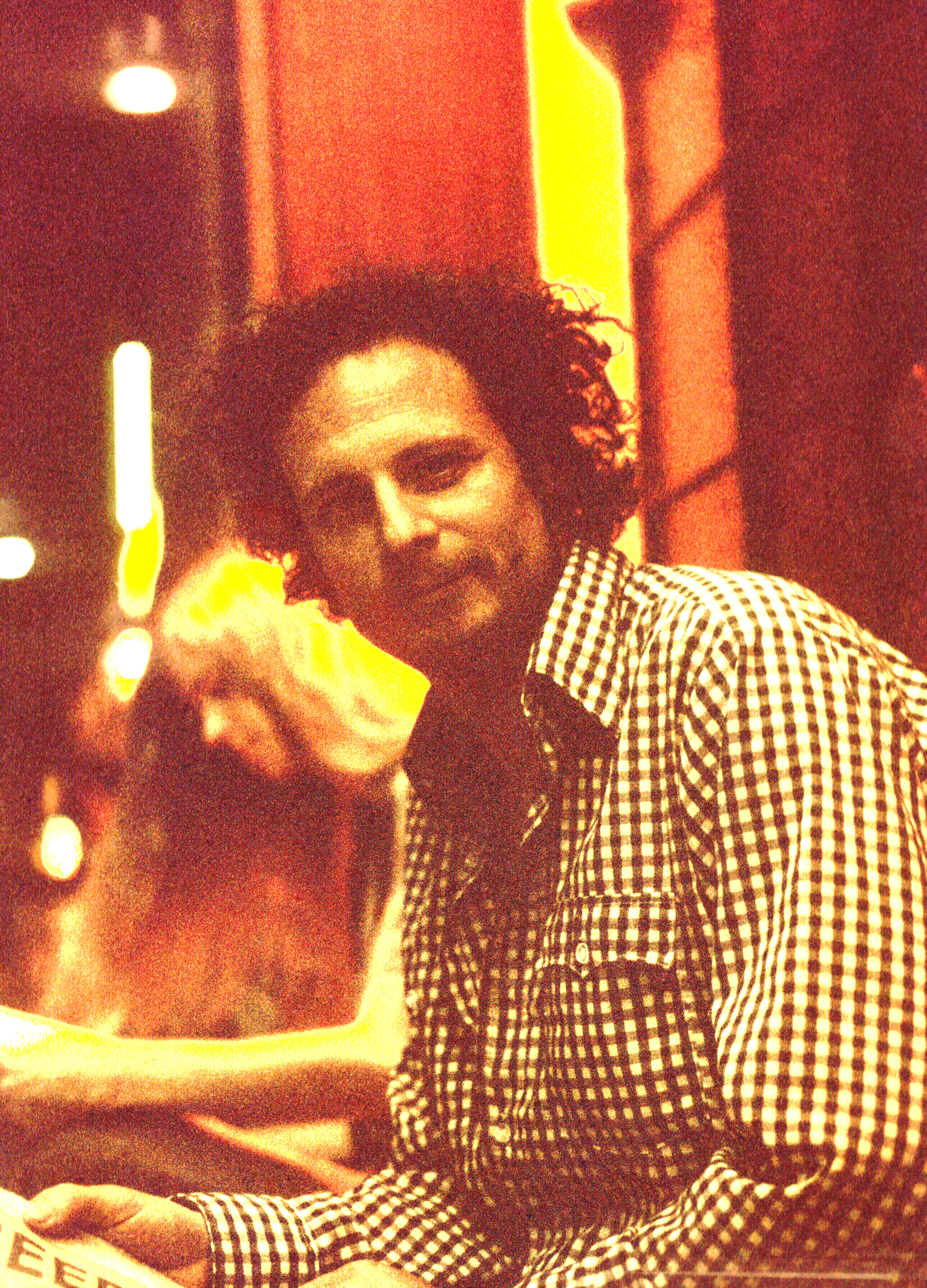
- Fischer c. 1975

Background information
- Born: Lawrence Wayne Fischer; November 6, 1944; Los Angeles, California, U.S.
- Died: June 16, 2011 (aged 66) Los Angeles, California, U.S.
- Genres: Outsider music
- Occupation: Songwriter
- Instruments: Vocals; guitar
- Years active: 1968–2006
- Labels: Bizarre; Rhino

Lawrence Wayne "Wild Man" Fischer (November 6, 1944 – June 16, 2011) was an American street performer known for offering erratic, a cappella performances of "new kinds of songs" for a dime on the beaches of Los Angeles County and the Sunset Strip in West Hollywood. Most of his life was spent homeless or institutionalized, and he later became regarded as "the godfather of outsider music".

Born in Los Angeles, Fischer was repeatedly sent to mental institutions as a teenager, where he was diagnosed with paranoid schizophrenia and bipolar disorder. In 1968, he began performing on the Sunset Strip. He recorded a single at UCLA and later met Frank Zappa, who produced his debut album, An Evening with Wild Man Fischer for the Bizarre label.

Fischer has been described as associated with the Los Angeles freak scene by music journalists. Fischer was the opening act for the Byrds, Iron Butterfly, Solomon Burke, and Bo Diddley. His relationship with Zappa came to an abrupt end after Fischer threw a bottle that nearly hit Zappa's daughter Moon. Fischer later collaborated with Smegma, Barnes & Barnes and Rosemary Clooney. He appeared in a 1973 live recording in the film New York Dolls: All Dolled Up (2005). His music influenced Genesis P-Orridge and Jon the Postman, and was played on radio shows hosted by Dr. Demento and John Peel.

In 1975, Fischer recorded a promotional single for Rhino Records entitled "Go to Rhino Records". The label put out a trilogy of albums that ultimately became his last: Wildmania (1977), Pronounced Normal (1981), and Nothing Scary (1983); the latter two were produced by the comedy music duo Barnes & Barnes. A documentary about Fischer's life, Derailroaded: Inside the Mind of Wild Man Fischer, premiered at the South by Southwest festival in 2005.

== Biography ==
=== Early life ===
Larry Fischer was born on November 6, 1944, in Los Angeles, California. From an early age, he experienced major mood swings typical of bipolar disorder. When his mood worsened, he experienced auditory hallucinations and acted violently toward his family. He attended Fairfax High School but was expelled in 1962 for singing in class. In 1963, he was committed to Camarillo State Hospital for threatening his mother with a knife, and he was diagnosed with paranoid schizophrenia and manic depression. Released one year later, he appeared at numerous talent shows and was discovered by R&B singer Solomon Burke, who gave him the nickname "Wild Man" and brought him along on a tour. Fischer was still living at home at this time, and in 1965, was once again institutionalized for his behavior. According to Fischer, the hospital stays only exacerbated his condition.

=== An Evening with Wild Man Fischer ===
"Merry Go Round" from An Evening with Wild Man Fischer (1968)
An excerpt of Fischer's best-known song, with instrumental accompaniment. In the album's liner notes, Frank Zappa advises to listen to the LP "several times before you decide whether or not you like it or what Wild Man Fischer is all about. He has something to say to you, even though you might not want to hear it."

By 1967, Fischer was on medication and acting as a street performer in Hollywood. For a nickel or a dime, he would offer a "new kind of song" to passersby as an a cappella performance. This led him to become an opening act for the Byrds, Bo Diddley, and Iron Butterfly. While performing onstage and outside at the Sunset Strip, he was noticed by Frank Zappa, bandleader for the Mothers of Invention. Zappa later said: "I thought from the first day I met him that someone should make an album about Wild Man Fischer." He invited Fischer into a studio and recorded him singing about topics such as his mother, mental hospitals, fame, circles, and how he could move faster than a cat could see him. The Mothers of Invention, record producer Kim Fowley, radio DJ Rodney Bingenheimer, and Zappa's girl group the GTOs made guest appearances on some of the tracks.

Released as a double album in 1968, An Evening with Wild Man Fischer was given a positive review in Rolling Stone magazine, where it was described as "captur[ing] the total being of one strange member of the human community". On September 23, 1968, thanks to his connections with Zappa, Fischer appeared on Rowan & Martin's Laugh-In, singing "The Leaves Are Falling" and "Merry-Go-Round". During this period he also made contributions to the 1968 psychsploitation album "Bedlam" by The Crazy People. In December, Zappa arranged for him to perform at a Christmas show involving the Mothers, the GTOs, Easy Chair, and Alice Cooper. Fischer sang "Circles".

Fischer was frustrated that the album failed to bring him the fame he expected. One day, he visited Zappa and threw a bottle that nearly hit Zappa's infant daughter Moon. This ended their relationship. After Frank's death in 1993, Gail Zappa inherited her husband's musical copyrights, and refused to reissue the album for as long as she lived feeling that the recording was "a poor example of Frank's work."

=== Rhino Records albums ===
In 1974, Fischer appeared as a guest vocalist on noise band Smegma's album Sing Popular Songs. In 1975, he recorded Rhino Records' first release, a novelty single entitled "Go to Rhino Records". At the time, Rhino Records was only a record shop in Los Angeles. According to the New York Times: "Demand for [the single] proved so great that it catapulted the store's owners into the record-producing business." Two years later he recorded their very first LP, Wildmania. In the 1980s, Fischer worked with the comedy music duo Barnes and Barnes (Bill Mumy and Robert Haimer) to produce two more albums for Rhino, Pronounced Normal (1981) and Nothing Scary (1984). In 1986, Barnes and Barnes also wrote and produced "It's a Hard Business", a duet featuring Fischer and Rosemary Clooney. The song was the result of a telephone friendship they began due to mutual acquaintances. In 1988, a judge awarded Fischer royalties on his song "Merry-Go-Round" (from the videocassette release of the movie Medium Cool), but the attorney representing Fischer did not know how to contact him. Fischer was still homeless, living in motels and on the streets while panhandling at places like Dodger Stadium and Disneyland. He performed at the 1988 San Diego Comic Con with Bill Mumy's group as his backing band.

In 1998, Date with the Devils Daughter, an album by Robert Williams (a drummer formerly with Captain Beefheart) includes "Hello Robert", which consists of messages that Fischer left on Williams's phone. In 1999, Rhino released The Fischer King, a two-CD package comprising 100 tracks and a 20-page booklet, which sold out within weeks. The limited-edition album comprises his entire Rhino catalog, including all three of the Rhino albums plus singles, unreleased material, interviews done for this release, and his duet with Clooney. It releases almost everything Fischer ever recorded, except An Evening with Wild Man Fischer, for which the Zappa family still held the rights.

=== Final years and death ===
Fischer was mentioned in Thomas Pynchon's 1990 novel, Vineland, as well as in his 2009 novel, Inherent Vice. In the early 2000s, Fischer was filmed as the subject of a full-length documentary, Derailroaded: Inside the Mind of Wild Man Fischer, which premiered at South by Southwest in March 2005. Co-director Josh Rubin called the four years making the film "the most arduous, trying time of my life" due to Fischer's erratic behavior. It included an appearance from Devo's Mark Mothersbaugh who called him: "as pure a rock and roll icon as you can find. He's mainlined into the creative subconscious." In 2004, Fischer was the subject of a comic book (The Legend of Wild Man Fischer by Dennis Eichhorn), and in October, appeared on ABC-TV's late-night talk/comedy show, Jimmy Kimmel Live!.

In 2003, Fischer had a six-month-long paranoid episode, convinced somebody was trying to kill him, and he started living on the streets again. He called Bill Mumy up to 20 times a day, hanging up each time, until Mumy finally had to change his phone number. Fischer eventually moved in with his aunt Josephine, but three weeks later she was diagnosed with terminal cancer (this happened during the filming of Derailroaded). Fischer and his family consented to move him into an assisted-living mental institution in Van Nuys. The medications he was prescribed helped him control his behavior, but it also eliminated his creative drive, or "pep". Fischer made his final performance on August 16, 2006, at the Trunk Space in Phoenix, Arizona.

The last seven years of Fischer's life were spent peacefully but uneventfully. On June 16, 2011, he died of heart failure at the Ronald Reagan UCLA Medical Center in Los Angeles, at the age of 66.

Fischer’s name appears in two Thomas Pynchon novels, Vineland and Inherent Vice.

== Discography ==
Studio albums

- 1969: An Evening with Wild Man Fischer (Bizarre Records)
- 1977: Wildmania (Rhino Records)
- 1981: Pronounced Normal (Rhino Records)
- 1983: Nothing Scary (Rhino Records)
- 2018: Deep State (CDBaby)

EP

- May 1968: Laminas (7-inch 33rpm project of UCLA art students, three tracks by Larry, miscredited as "Fisher")

Compilations

- 1981: The First One ...(First-1) (A.T.C. Records)
- 1999: The Fischer King (Rhino Records) (compilation of all Rhino recordings)

Singles

- 1968: "The Circle" / "Merry Go Round" (Reprise Records)
- 1975: "Go To Rhino Records" (Rhino Records)
- 1981: "Don't Be A Singer" / "I Got A Camera" /" Do The Salvo" (Rhino Records)
- 1981: "Larry Comes Alive" (A.T.C. Records)

Popular Culture

Fischer’s name appears in two Thomas Pynchon novels, Vineland and Inherent Vice.

== Filmography ==
- 2005: Derailroaded: Inside the Mind of Wild Man Fischer
- 2005: New York Dolls: All Dolled Up
