= An Evening with Wild Man Fischer =

Studio album by Wild Man Fischer
- Released: April 28, 1969
- Recorded: 1968
- Studios: Sunset Sound, Los Angeles and The Log Cabin, Los Angeles
- Genre: Outsider music
- Length: 82:36
- Label: Bizarre
- Producer: Frank Zappa

Wild Man Fischer chronology
An Evening with Wild Man Fischer (1969)	Wildmania (1977)

Professional ratings
Review scores
Source	Rating
AllMusic	4/5 stars
Billboard	4/4 stars
Rolling Stone	(mixed)
The Village Voice	B

An Evening with Wild Man Fischer is a 1969 double LP album by Wild Man Fischer. It was produced by Frank Zappa and released on his label Bizarre Records.

The album is split into four different areas on each record side for the type of song they contain. Some of side one had audio clips of live street performances where he would ask passerby to hear a song for a dime, with percussion noises from Art Tripp added in. Side two is a collection of a cappella songs from Larry, with him also occasionally using a guitar to strum or use as percussion. Side three is filled with Fischer's first songs, and his stories of making them, as well as more street performances with Art's percussion. The final side includes a psychedelic rock song called "The Circle", and "The Wild Man Fischer Story", which had Fischer sing about his home life by year. The song "Merry Go Round", as well as Fischer's remark of "You call that doing your thing?" during "New Kind of Songs for Sale", were referenced in the spoken dialogue segments of Zappa's own albums Lumpy Gravy and Civilization Phase III.

The copyright is owned by the estate of Frank Zappa, whose widow Gail had refused to release it on compact disc. After Gail's death, the album was finally issued on a double CD in 2016 on the Gonzo Multimedia label. The audio on this CD version was copied from a vinyl copy.

A second CD edition was issued in 2020 by the Japanese label Wasabi Records. This release, unlike the Gonzo Multimedia edition, credits Herb Cohen as the master owner and reproduces the original Bizarre Records labels on the faces of the CD.

"Merry Go Round" was used as the theme for Alexei Sayle's Merry-Go-Round in 1998.

== Track listing (including explanatory notes) ==
Side One: The Basic Fischer
No.	Title	Length
1.	"Merry-Go-Round"	1:53
2.	"New Kind of Songs For Sale" (live on the strip)	7:13
3.	"I'm Not Shy Anymore!" (Larry relives the past in the studio)	1:01
4.	"Are You From Clovis?"	1:53
5.	"The Madness & Ecstasy" (Kim Fowley & Rodney Bingenheimer provide an introduction to, and make prophecies about the future of Wild Man Fischer)	7:47

Side Two: Larry's Songs, Unaccompanied
No.	Title	Length
1.	"Which Way Did the Freaks Go?"	1:47
2.	"I'm Working For the Federal Bureau of Narcotics"	1:21
3.	"The Leaves Are Falling"	0:54
4.	"85 Times"	0:56
5.	"Cops & Robbers"	1:40
6.	"Monkeys Versus Donkeys"	2:00
7.	"Start Life Over Again"	1:58
8.	"The Mope"	1:48
9.	"Life Brand New"	1:36
10.	"Who Did It Johnny?"	1:46
11.	"Think of Me When Your Clothes Are Off"	0:57
12.	"Taggy Lee"	0:40
13.	"Rhonda"	0:54
14.	"I Looked Around You"	1:31
15.	"Jennifer Jones"	4:51

Side Three: Some Historical Notes
No.	Title	Length
1.	"The Taster" (fancy version)	3:07
2.	"The Story of The Taster"	2:05
3.	"The Rocket Rock"	0:31
4.	"The Rocket Rock Explanation & Dialog"	1:33
5.	"Dream Girl"	2:25
6.	"Dream Girl Explanation"	0:52
7.	"Serrano (Sorrento?) Beach"	1:35
8.	"Success Will Not Make Me Happy"	1:45
9.	"Wild Man On The Strip Again"	7:13

Side Four: In Conclusion
No.	Title	Length
1.	"Why I Am Normal"	2:25
2.	"The Wild Man Fischer Story"	5:34
3.	"Balling Isn't Everything"	1:17
4.	"Ugly Beautiful Girl"	1:14
5.	"Larry & His Guitar"	2:46
6.	"The Circle"	2:54
7.	"Larry Under Pressure"	1:44

== Personnel ==
- Larry Fischer - vocals, electric guitar (on "Larry & His Guitar")
- Frank Zappa - Guitar on "The Taster" (Fancy version), all instruments on "Circle", production
- The Mothers of Invention - piano, bass & drums (on "The Taster (fancy version)")
- Art Tripp - percussion (Side One)
- Kim Fowley - recitation ("The Madness & Ecstasy")
- Rodney Bingenheimer - recitation ("The Madness & Ecstasy")
- The GTOs - recitation ("The Madness & Ecstasy")
