= Ogden Edsl =

Novelty underground musical artist

- Origin: Omaha, Nebraska, U.S.
- Genres: Parody, comedy
- Years active: 1970-1983
- Label: Rhino Entertainment
- Past members: 1973-1974 Drums: Bobby Susskind, Bass: Mouse Nelson, Perc: Jeff Garetz, EGT/Voc: Bill Carey, EGT/KBD/Voc: Richie Thieman, Flute/Voc: Tommy Norcutt, Front/Voc: Doug Wesselmann as "Otis XII, Front/Voc/Trumpet: Bill Frenzer, Audio/Video/Producer: Michael Braunstein

Ogden Edsl (shortened from "The Ogden Edsl Wahalia Blues Ensemble Mondo Bizzario Band") was an American band, formed in 1970 in Omaha, Nebraska, by Bill Frenzer, Bill Carey, and Otis XII. Their music was often darkly comedic and satirical, and was frequently featured on Dr. Demento's weekly radio program.

Popular songs from Ogden Edsl included "Dead Puppies", "Kinko the Clown", and "Daddy's Money". Over the years, the band has achieved a cult following in American sub-culture. The band's name references both poet Ogden Nash and two automobile brands, Nash Motors and Edsel.

== History ==
Ogden Edsl's career began by playing the Omaha and Lincoln circuits for about four years. The shows featured not only satirical music and parodies, but also comedy sketches. During this time, they also recorded a 65-episode radio serial.

Throughout 1973 and 1974, the members of Ogden Edsl expanded their territory by playing gigs throughout the Midwest with a ten-piece band. They also added TV monitors to their act, which displayed video comedy skits and special effects synchronized to their music. On June 1, 1974, seven core members of the Ogden Edsl arrived in Los Angeles after a lengthy road trip. Within days they were in the Record Plant Studio C recording basic tracks for "Stuffed" with producer and engineer Kelly Kotera. Subsequently, the band played well-received gigs at The Comedy Store (June 16); The Icehouse Pasadena, (June 23) opening for Oingo Boingo; The Troubador (July 1); Whiskey A-Go-Go; Gazzari's. However, by July 10, personal decisions by some band members to return to the Omaha home-base led to the dissolution of the nine-piece version of the band despite bookings at other Los Angeles area venues and pending negotiations with the Smothers Brothers for a potential appearance on their show. Between 1974 and 1976, the band recorded an LP, Stuffed, released on the Sunburn record label.

In the late 1970s, the band moved to San Francisco and Los Angeles to work on some TV shows and produce a local radio series.

For a long period of time, Ogden Edsl's "Dead Puppies" was the most requested song on the Dr. Demento radio show, and remains the only song to ever hit number one on the annual "Funny 25" countdown two years in a row (1982 and 1983).

Ogden Edsl formally disbanded in 1983. An anthology of their hits featuring Bill Frenzer was released in 1995 by Oglio Records, entitled Mower of the Ogden Edsl. Clips of Ogden Edsl songs, namely "Dead Puppies", frequently circulated amongst AOL users as chatroom-playable .wav files in the mid and late 1990s.

Ogden Edsl was inducted into the Nebraska Music Hall of Fame on 27 October 2001 at the Ranch Bowl in Omaha, and performed one last time before a hometown crowd.

The song "Kinko the Clown", about a pedophile who poses as a clown to lure children, appears on The Rhino Brothers Present the World's Worst Records.
