= Fish Heads (song) =

1978 novelty song by Barnes & Barnes

Single by Barnes & Barnes

from the album Voobaha
- B-side: "High School Gym"
- Released: 1978
- Genre: Novelty
- Label: Lumania Records
- Songwriters: Barnes & Barnes

Official audio
- "Fish Heads" on YouTube

"Fish Heads" is a novelty song by comedy rock duo Barnes & Barnes, released as a single in 1978 and later featured on their 1980 album Voobaha. It is the most requested song on the Dr. Demento radio show, and a music video for the song made in 1980 was in regular rotation on MTV. The song was featured on Barnes & Barnes' 1982 Fish Heads (Greatest Hits) 12-inch on Rhino Records.

The duo was formed in 1970 by actor Bill Mumy and Robert Haimer (March 2, 1954 – March 4, 2023)—who were high school classmates—originally as a private home recording project.

The lyrics are an absurdist celebration of fish heads, describing them in the high-pitched chorus as "roly poly" and delicious to eat. The verses describe various things they (mostly) cannot do, such as play baseball, wear sweaters, play the drums, and drink cappuccino in Italian restaurants with Oriental women.

Actor Bill Paxton, a filmmaker at the time, directed and appeared in the music video for the song, along with cinematographer Rocky Schenck and Robert Haimer's girlfriend at the time, Joan Farber, who designed the costumes. The video aired on NBC television on Saturday Night Live on December 6, 1980, and the following week. Dr. Demento had a cameo as the bum; he later recalled how he discovered the song, in that Barnes and Barnes had originally submitted a song about vomit that he knew would have never passed his home station's Broadcast Standards and Practices, asked the duo for something that was airable on the radio, and was sent "Fish Heads" as an alternative.

In 1985, the video was incorporated into several episodes of the Nickelodeon sketch show Turkey Television.

The song is featured in The Simpsons episode "Treehouse of Horror VII". Alan Arkin sings the song in the 1993 movie Indian Summer. In the 2017 television episode "Goodwill" of Halt and Catch Fire, Joe and Haley listen to the song while driving in Joe's car.
