= Zabagabee: The Best of Barnes & Barnes =

Greatest hits album by Barnes & Barnes
- Released: 1987
- Recorded: Lumania, 1978–1987; Human Nature, Devo Studio, 1987
- Genre: Novelty rock, synthpop, comedy, novelty
- Length: 49:31 (LP/cassette); 64:58 (CD)
- Label: Rhino
- Producer: Barnes & Barnes, Gerry Beckley (for "Blithering"), Bob Casale (for "What's New Pussycat")

Barnes & Barnes chronology
Sicks (1986)	Zabagabee: The Best of Barnes & Barnes (1987)	Loozanteen (1991)

Professional ratings
Review scores
Source	Rating
Allmusic	4.5/5 stars

Zabagabee: The Best of Barnes & Barnes is the seventh album released by novelty rock group Barnes & Barnes.

== Track listing ==
1. "Fish Heads"
2. "Blithering"
3. "Soak It Up"
4. "Ah A"
5. "Boogie Woogie Amputee"
6. "Life Is Safer When You're Sleeping"
7. "Unfinished Business"
8. "Pussy Whipped"
9. "What's New Pussycat?"
10. "Party In My Pants"
11. "Don't You Want To Go To The Moon"
12. "Pizza Face"
13. "Love Tap"
14. "I Don't Remember Tomorrow"
15. "Cemetery Girls"
16. "When You Die"
17. "Cats"
18. "Something's In The Bag"
19. "Swallow My Love"
20. "Loch Ness Lady"
21. "The Ballad of Jim Joy"
