= Barnes & Barnes =

American musical duo

- Origin: Los Angeles, California
- Genres: Comedy rock, new wave, synthpop, experimental
- Years active: 1970–2023
- Labels: Lumania, Rhino, Boulevard, Oglio, Collectors' Choice, Demented Punk
- Past members: Art Barnes (Bill Mumy); Artie Barnes (Robert Haimer)

Barnes & Barnes were an American musical duo, formed in Los Angeles in 1970. Most commonly associated with novelty music and comedy rock, their music also incorporated elements of new wave, synth-pop, and folk rock.

The duo was formed in 1970 by actor Bill Mumy and Robert Haimer (March 2, 1954 – March 4, 2023), who were high school classmates, originally as a private home recording project. By 1978, Barnes & Barnes had gained public recognition with the radio debut of their novelty song "Fish Heads," on the US nationally syndicated Dr. Demento Show.

When recording or performing as Barnes & Barnes, Mumy and Haimer adopted the personae of Art Barnes and Artie Barnes, respectively: twin brothers from the fictional civilization of Lumania.

== History ==
Robert Haimer and Bill Mumy were childhood friends who occasionally performed together on their musical instruments. After the cancellation of Mumy's TV series Lost in Space in 1968, they shot short films with a Super 8 motion picture camera, dubbed "Art Films". The two began calling each other "Art" in joking reference to these films.

They formed the band Barnes & Barnes in 1970. They started when they were about 16 with a two-track recorder. Their surname Barnes was taken from a Bill Cosby comedy routine called "Revenge", in which a character called Junior Barnes throws a slushball at Cosby as a child. Originally, both Haimer and Mumy were named "Art Barnes", but Haimer's alter ego was publicly renamed "Artie" in 1979 to differentiate between them.

The band first received airplay on The Dr. Demento Show in 1978. Haimer was a fan of the show, and convinced Mumy to "pick a couple of songs and do them right" to send in. This resulted in their songs "Boogie Woogie Amputee" and "Fish Heads", which they re-recorded on a Teac four track machine. The latter recording was released as a single on their own Lumania Records in 1979 and remains their best-known song, as well as the most requested song in the history of The Dr. Demento Show.

In 1978, Damaskas and Barnes & Barnes recorded "A Day in the Life of Green Acres", a song that combined the music of The Beatles' "A Day in the Life" with the lyrics to the theme song of the television show Green Acres. It was inspired by Little Roger and the Goosebumps' similar intertwining of Led Zeppelin's "Stairway to Heaven" and the theme to Gilligan's Island.

Barnes & Barnes released a four-song EP in 1982 featuring the songs "I Had Sex with E.T." and "I Had Sex with Pac-Man". Both songs had identical music but different lyrics. It was rumored that Spielberg or Universal's lawyers requested that the EP be removed from the shelves, and very few were sold. The "I Had Sex with..." songs were never released on any Barnes & Barnes compilation. Both songs ended with, "Eat them up, yum!" Their song "Something's In The Bag" was also frequently played on Dr. Demento.

Haimer died in March 2023, putting an end to the group.

== Discography ==
With the exception of Soak It Up and Yeah: The Essential Barnes & Barnes, all of their initial albums were released on Rhino Records. All of their '90s rereleases were on CD, with bonus tracks, on Oglio Records.

- Voobaha (1980)
- Spazchow (1981)
- Barnes & Barnes (EP; 1982)
- Fish Heads: Barnes & Barnes' Greatest Hits (compilation EP; 1982)
- Soak It Up (EP; 1983)
- Code of Honor (intended for release 1983; material included in Kodovoner in 2005)
- Amazing Adult Fantasy (1984)
- Sicks (1986)
- Zabagabee: The Best of Barnes & Barnes (compilation; 1987)
- Hictabur (intended for release 1988, released 2016)
- Loozanteen (1991)
- The Dinosaur Album (1993)
- Yeah: The Essential Barnes & Barnes (compilation; 2000)
- Kodovoner (2005)
- Opbopachop (2009)
- Holidaze in Lumania (2018)
- Creepy Scary (2019)
- Pancake Dream (2021)
- Haimoom (2022)

== Producing work ==
Barnes and Barnes produced two albums for Wild Man Fischer and one album for Crispin Glover.
