= Boulevard Records (U.S.) =

Boulevard Records was an American record label. In 1954, it released the hit record "Runaround" by The Three Chuckles. Later that year, it sold the Chuckles' masters to Label X, a Victor subsidiary. Boulevard Records later released novelty records, including several albums by Barnes & Barnes.

It should not be confused with Blues Boulevard Records, a Florida-based record label.
