= Dr. Demento =

American radio broadcaster and record collector (b. 1941)

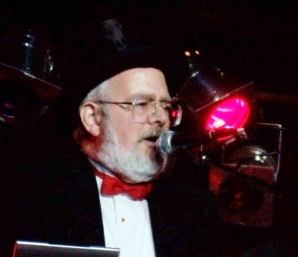
- Dr. Demento in 2004

Background information
- Also known as: Barry Hansen
- Born: Barret Eugene Hansen; April 2, 1941 (age 85); Minneapolis, Minnesota, US
- Genres: Comedy; parody
- Occupation: Disc jockey
- Years active: 1961–2025
- Website: drdemento.com

Barret Eugene Hansen (born April 2, 1941), also known professionally as Dr. Demento, is a retired American radio broadcaster and record collector. He has specialized in novelty songs, comedy, and unusual recordings, but has also spoken about the history of recorded music.

Hansen created the Demento persona in 1970 while working at KPPC-FM in Pasadena, California. After playing "Transfusion" by Nervous Norvus on air, DJ "The Obscene" Steven Clean remarked that Hansen had to be "demented" to play it; Clean and Peter Wolf then devised a "mythical character" named Dr. Demento that would become Hansen's persona. His weekly show went into syndication in 1974 and was syndicated by the Westwood One Radio Network from 1978 to 1992. Broadcast syndication of the show ended on June 6, 2010, but the show continued weekly online until his retirement in October 2025.

Hansen holds a master's degree in ethnomusicology and has written for magazines and as a liner notes author for recording artists outside the novelty genre. He is credited with introducing generations of listeners to early and mid-20th-century artists such as Harry McClintock, Spike Jones, Jimmy Durante, Benny Bell, Rusty Warren, Yogi Yorgesson, Nervous Norvus, Allan Sherman, Ray Stevens, Candy Candido, Stan Freberg, and Tom Lehrer. He also helped bring "Weird Al" Yankovic to national attention.

== Early life ==
Barret Eugene Hansen was born in Minneapolis, Minnesota, the son of an amateur pianist. He began his record collection at age 12 after learning that old 78 rpm records were 5¢ each at a local thrift store and credits his parents with introducing him to novelty music, commenting that his passion for music might not have developed had he been born later and been exposed to television at a younger age. He attended Reed College in Portland, Oregon, serving as program director of KRRC in 1960 and general manager in 1961. He wrote his senior thesis on Alban Berg's opera Wozzeck and Claude Debussy's Pelléas et Mélisande. He graduated in 1963 and later earned a master's in folklore and ethnomusicology from UCLA.

After completing his master's degree, he lived for two years in Topanga Canyon with members of the rock band Spirit, briefly working as a roadie for them and for Canned Heat. He joined Specialty Records as an A&R man and started his weekly radio show while there, later moving to Warner Bros. Records. He prepared many "Warner/Reprise Loss Leaders" mail-order compilations in the 1970s, which were advertised on inner sleeves and only available by mail order at $1 per LP. Most were double LPs, priced at $2, at a time when double LPs typically cost $9.98. As Barry Hansen, he contributed magazine articles (Rolling Stone, Down Beat, Hit Parader), liner notes, and wrote the "Rhythm and Gospel" chapter in The Rolling Stone Illustrated History of Rock & Roll.

== Career ==
=== The Dr. Demento radio show ===
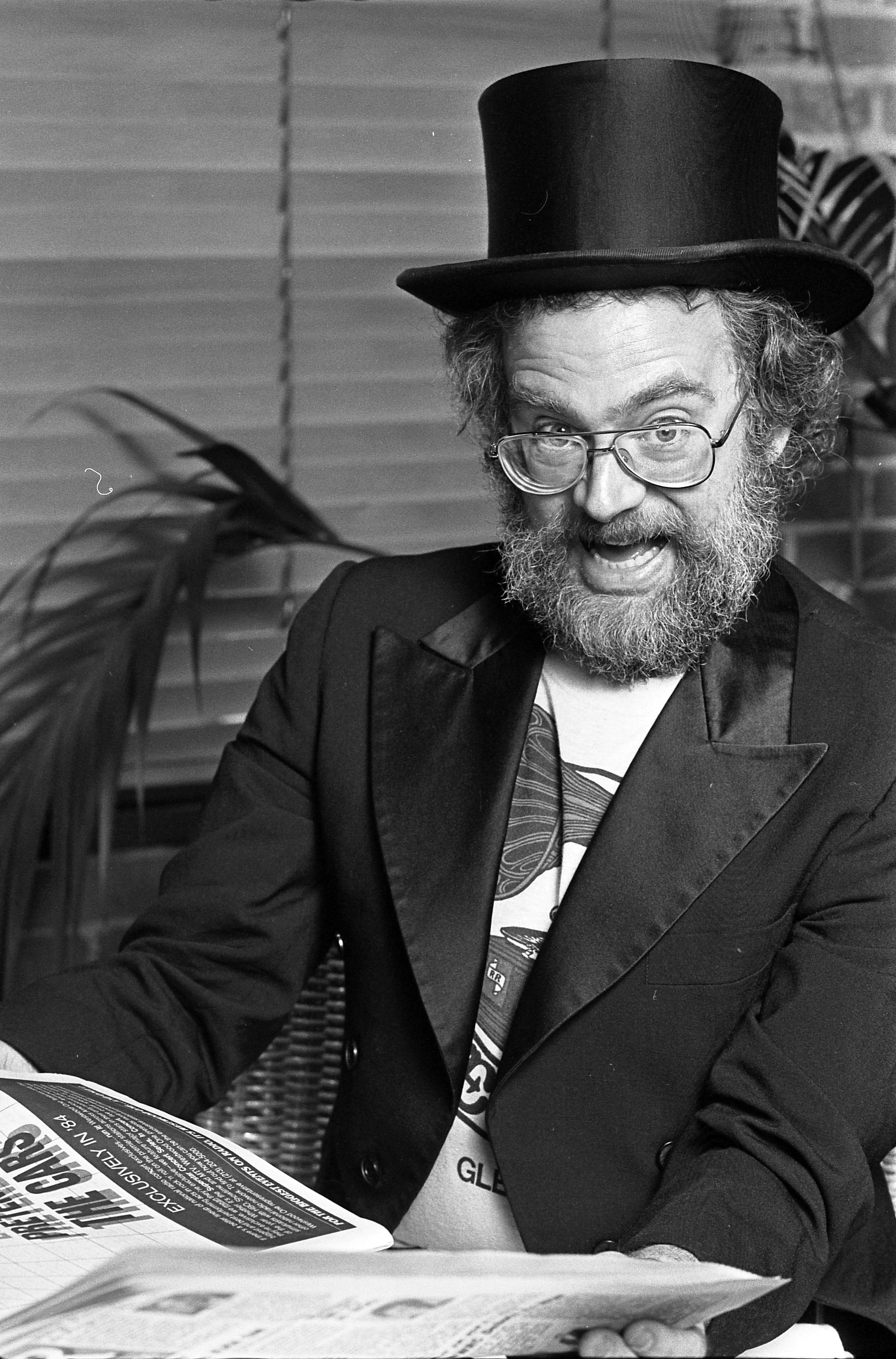
Dr. Demento in 1984

Hansen created Dr. Demento in 1970 at KPPC in Pasadena, California. Positive listener response led him to turn his rock oldies show into an all-novelty format. At the end of 1971, he moved to KMET in Los Angeles, hosting a four-hour live show from 1972 to 1983. From about 1974, the local version was four hours while the syndicated show was two. He often played punk records in the mid-1970s, earning respect among the punk scene. The show moved to KLSX, then to KSCA, until KSCA changed format in February 1997.

The show went into national syndication in 1974, produced by Larry Gordon of Gordon/Casady, and from 1978 to 1992 was with Westwood One, marking its national popularity peak. Producers included Lynnsey Guererro (1978–1982), and Robert Young (1982–1990), who expanded the show's reach, coordinated live performances, and later released the e-book "Producing Demento."

From 1992 to 2000, syndication was by On the Radio Broadcasting. Hansen established Talonian Productions and distributed the show himself from then onward; he did not reveal his ownership of Talonian publicly until 2007. Between the mid-1970s and the mid-1990s, he continued live broadcasts on KMET and Los Angeles stations, and made TV appearances on The Gong Show (1988–89), Bobby's World, The Simpsons, and on the music video for Barnes and Barnes' "Fish Heads" and Weird Al Yankovic's "I Lost On Jeopardy".

The syndicated show opened with audience requests, followed by a themed second hour and a "Funny Five" countdown of top requests. Holiday-themed shows, especially at Halloween and Christmas, were frequent, as were the annual, year-end "Funny 25" countdowns. Hansen typically produced 52 original episodes annually.

The program's opening theme is an instrumental of "Pico and Sepulveda" by The Roto Rooter Good Time Christmas Band; during the early KMET years, it was "Sugar Blues" by Clyde McCoy. Short musical teasers and countdown intros were recorded by the same band or sampled from Harry Partch's "Barstow". Hansen's opening line, "Wind up your radios," refers to 78 rpm records from his collection, and the closing theme is "Cheerio, Cherry Lips, Cheerio" by Scrappy Lambert (aka Gordon Wallace). He ends each show with "Stay Dement-ed!"

Since 1987, "Whimsical" Will Simpson has produced a weekly "Demented News" segment and recorded break-in comedy interviews, including "Hey Dickie", using posthumous samples of Dickie Goodman, the pioneer of the break-in comedy genre and a frequently requested artist on the show.

By the late 1980s, the show lost affiliates due to radio industry changes. In 1992, Westwood One dropped the show; On the Radio Broadcasting immediately picked it up. The new syndicator allowed tracks Westwood One would not, such as "It's A Gas" by Alfred E. Neuman and "Moose Turd Pie" by Utah Phillips, as well as allowing the time for Whimsical Will's "Demented News" segment to air nationally.

In 2000, Hansen formed Talonian Productions for self-syndication. Dwindling ad revenue forced him to change to a fee-based model for most stations. In October 2007, Hansen stated financial issues jeopardized the show's future. On June 6, 2010, following the loss of its largest market station, WLUP in Chicago, the terrestrial radio version ended; new episodes continued online each Saturday. The show ran on KACV-FM in Amarillo through January 2011 to fulfill its remaining carriage contract. Hansen observed that changing radio demographics and his show's "odd duck" status made finding a home on modern formats difficult.

=== Online streaming and series end ===
Beginning around 2006, The Dr. Demento Show began pay-per-show audio streaming at its official website. Archives from 1974 onward, and most of the post-2012 Westwood One-era syndicated programs, became available. Some archived live Los Angeles shows were added as well. Stations were barred from online streaming by contract, leading to further drops in affiliate count, with only six stations airing the show by the end of its terrestrial run, down from over 100 at its peak. Hansen hoped the online version would attract advertisers, which never materialized.

The online show continued the original format, but often ran longer, with flexible segments and a monthly Top Ten in place of the weekly "Funny Five." Hansen was also able to feature less-censored or rare records. In 2024, Hansen began shifting the writing and editing duties for the program to Jeff Morris, who created the Demented Music Database which tracked the show's playlists.

The last traditional new episode of Dr. Demento was released May 31, 2025. The next five months of episodes would be devoted to a retrospective of the program, including one all-request episode. The final show was released on October 11, a countdown of the top 40 most requested songs during the 55-year run of the show.

==== Other media ====
From 2003 to 2005, XM Satellite Radio aired a weekly "Best of Dr. Demento" show on channels including Special X, 60s on 6, Deep Tracks, and Laugh USA.

Hansen appeared in the 2005 documentary Derailroaded: Inside The Mind Of Wild Man Fischer and, in 2007, as Hippocrates on The Radio Adventures of Dr. Floyd.

He has made guest appearances on other shows, including guest-hosting for Montel Williams on Air America Media (Halloween 2009), on Anything Anything with Rich Russo in 2011 and 2013, and with classical host Jim Svejda each New Year's Eve until Svejda's 2022 retirement.

In April 2013, Meep Morp Studios began a Kickstarter for a documentary, Under the Smogberry Trees: The True Story of Dr. Demento. The campaign was funded, but in September 2016 Hansen withdrew support, issued a cease and desist order to Meep Morp Studios, and announced his own version of Under the Smogberry Trees to be directed by Devin Lucas (which was never released).

=== Honors ===
Dr. Demento was inducted into the Comedy Music Hall of Fame in 2005, the National Radio Hall of Fame in 2009, and the Oregon Music Hall of Fame in 2014. His alma mater Reed College awarded him the Thomas Lamb Eliot Lifetime Achievement Award in 2025.

== Personal life ==
Hansen was married to Sue Hansen (née Sue Charles) from 1983 to her death in 2017. The couple was childless by choice, and Hansen does not keep pets. Sue had worked as a clerk and training officer at Union Pacific. Hansen describes himself as an "armchair railfan" and occasionally played railroad-related songs on his show. He credited his wife with saving his life after the hard-living Los Angeles years.

Hansen is interested in the roots of rock 'n' roll in R&B and country music, and has written about them in magazine articles, liner notes, two chapters of The Rolling Stone Illustrated History of Rock & Roll, and his master's thesis. He plays piano at an amateur level and played in some blues bands prior to his radio career.

His collection includes over 85,000 records. He estimated it at 300,000 in 2010 but has lost count. The collection includes nearly every record sent by listeners; he listened to submissions personally when assembling shows.

== Influence ==
Dr. Demento is known for bringing parodist "Weird Al" Yankovic to national attention. In 1976, after Hansen spoke at Yankovic's school, Yankovic sent him a tape of parodies. The first song, "Belvedere Cruisin", prompted a positive listener response and led to further recordings. Hansen then funded Yankovic's first EP, Another One Rides the Bus, which led to a record deal. Hansen appears in several of Weird Al's music videos and the movie UHF.

Other artists who gained exposure via Dr. Demento include Barnes & Barnes ("Fish Heads"), Ogden Edsl, Larry "Wild Man" Fischer, Larry Groce ("Junk Food Junkie"), Elmo and Patsy ("Grandma Got Run Over by a Reindeer") and Weird Paul Petroskey. The show revived novelty hits overlooked by mainstream radio and promoted earlier artists like Benny Bell, Spike Jones, Tom Lehrer, and Stan Freberg.

Frank Zappa, a major influence, appeared several times as a guest. Upon Zappa's 1993 death, the entire show was devoted to his work for the first time. Other memorable episodes featured Spinal Tap, Screamin' Jay Hawkins, and Mel Brooks.

Dr. Demento was parodied on Mr. Show with Bob and David as "Dr. Retarded", and is featured as an expert on "paranormal monster parties" music.

Rainn Wilson played Dr. Demento in the film Weird: The Al Yankovic Story. Hansen himself appeared as Dr. Demento on season 2 episodes 6 and 15 of Georgie and Mandy's First Marriage.

== Discography ==
A number of Dr. Demento compilations have been released:

- Dr. Demento's Delights (1975)
- Dr. Demento's Dementia Royale (1980)
- Dr. Demento's Mementos (1982)
- Dr. Demento Presents the Greatest Novelty Records of All Time, Volume I: The 1940s (and Before) (1985)
- Dr. Demento Presents the Greatest Novelty Records of All Time, Volume II: The 1950s (1985)
- Dr. Demento Presents the Greatest Novelty Records of All Time, Volume III: The 1960s (1985)
- Dr. Demento Presents the Greatest Novelty Records of All Time, Volume IV: The 1970s (1985)
- Dr. Demento Presents the Greatest Novelty Records of All Time, Volume V: The 1980s (1985)
- Dr. Demento Presents the Greatest Novelty Records of All Time, Volume VI: Christmas (1985)
- Dr. Demento Presents the Greatest Novelty CD of All Time (1988)
- Dr. Demento Presents the Greatest Christmas Novelty CD of All Time (1989)
- Dr. Demento 20th Anniversary Collection (1991)
- Dr. Demento: Holidays in Dementia (1995)
- Dr. Demento's Country Corn (1995)
- Dr. Demento 25th Anniversary Collection (1996)
- Dr. Demento 2000! 30th Anniversary Collection (2001)
- Dr. Demento's Hits from Outer Space (2003)
- The Dr. Demento Interviews (2013)
- Dr. Demento Covered in Punk (2018)
- First Century Dementia – The Oldest Novelty Records of All Time (2020)

The Demento Society released members-only demo compilations Dr. Demento's Basement Tapes annually from 1991 to 2008. In 2013, Meep Morp Studio compiled all 17 Basement Tapes into a boxed set, limited to 50 copies as a Kickstarter reward for Under the Smogberry Trees and signed by Dr. Demento.
