= "Weird Al" Yankovic =

American comedy musician (born 1959)

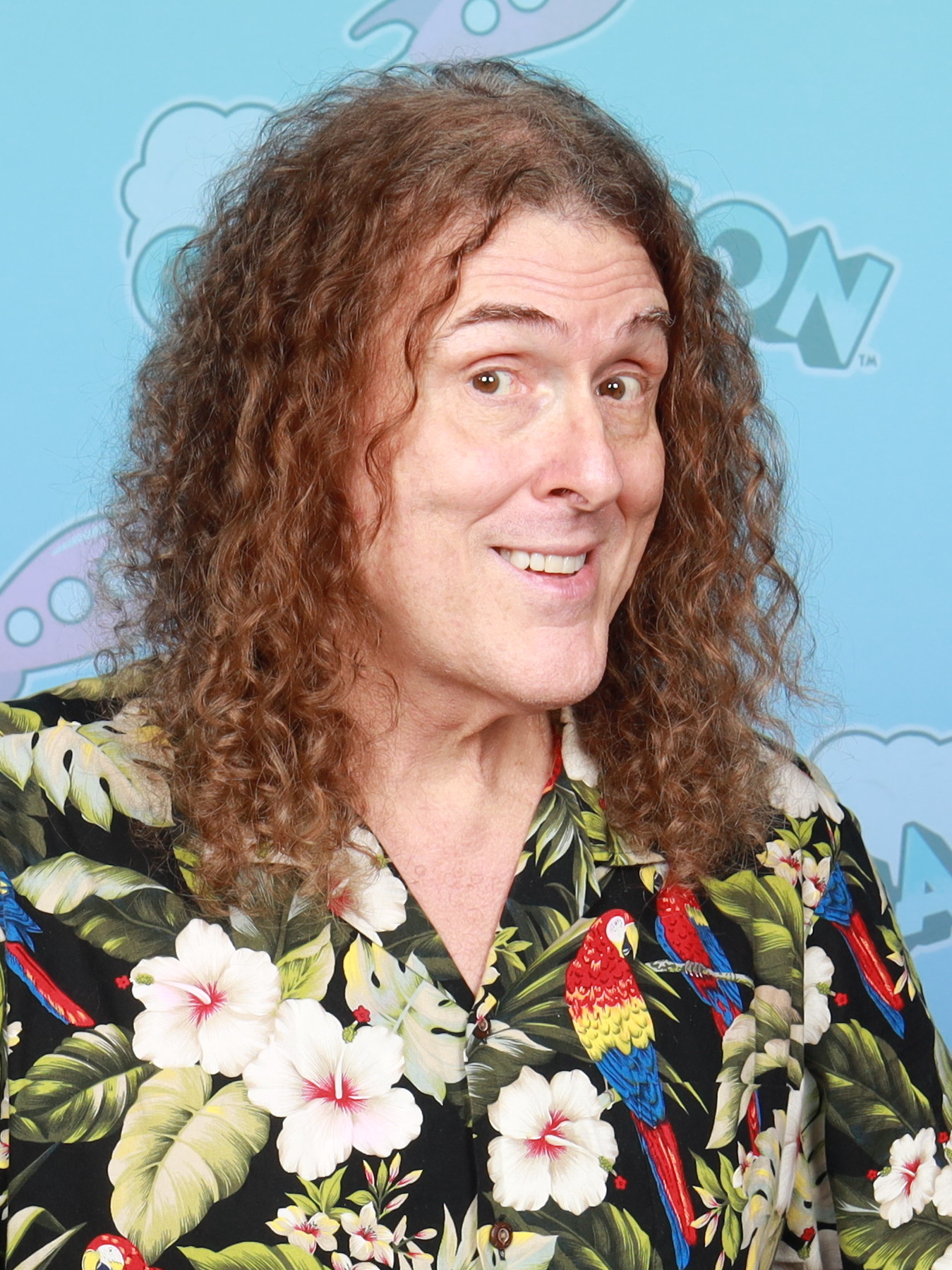
- Yankovic in 2025

Background information
- Born: Alfred Matthew Yankovic; October 23, 1959 (age 67); Downey, California, U.S.
- Origin: Lynwood, California, U.S.
- Genres: Comedy; parody; polka
- Occupations: Singer; musician; songwriter
- Instruments: Vocals; accordion; keyboards
- Works: Discography; videography; polka medleys
- Years active: 1976–present
- Labels: Rock 'n Roll; Capitol; Placebo; TK; Scotti Brothers; Way Moby; Volcano; RCA
- Spouse: Suzanne Yankovic (m. 2001)
- Children: 1
- Website: weirdal.com

Alfred Matthew "Weird Al" Yankovic (Note: Pronunciation: /ˈjæŋkəvɪk/) (born October 23, 1959) is an American musician. Yankovic is known for writing and performing comedy songs that often parody songs by other musicians. He also performs original songs that are style pastiches of the work of other acts, as well as polka medleys of popular songs, most of which feature his trademark accordion. Since having one of his comedy songs aired on The Dr. Demento Radio Show in 1976 at age 16, Yankovic has sold more than 12 million albums (as of 2025), recorded more than 150 parodies and original songs, and performed more than 2,000 live shows.

Yankovic's success has been attributed to his effective use of music videos to further parody pop culture, the songs' original artists, and the original music videos themselves. He has directed some of his own music videos and also directed music videos for other artists including Ben Folds, Hanson, the Black Crowes, and the Presidents of the United States of America. With the decline of music television and the onset of social media, he used YouTube and other video sites to publish his videos; this strategy helped boost sales of his later albums. He has not released a full album since Mandatory Fun, opting instead for timely releases of singles amid touring.

Yankovic's work has earned him five Grammy Awards and a further eleven nominations, four gold records and six platinum records in the U.S. His first top ten Billboard album (Straight Outta Lynwood) and single ("White & Nerdy") were both released in 2006, nearly three decades into his career. His fourteenth studio album, Mandatory Fun (2014), became his first number-one album during its debut week. In addition to his music career, Yankovic wrote and starred in the film UHF (1989) and the television series The Weird Al Show (1997). He has produced two satirical films about his own life, The Compleat Al (1985) and Weird: The Al Yankovic Story (2022). He has appeared in various television shows and web series, in addition to starring in Al TV specials on MTV. He has also written two children's books, When I Grow Up (2011) and My New Teacher and Me! (2013).

== Early life ==
External videos
- 'Weird Al' Yankovic – Wikipedia: Fact or Fiction?, 7:02, Diffuser.fm

Alfred Matthew Yankovic was born in Downey, California, on October 23, 1959, the only child of Mary Elizabeth (née Vivalda) and Nick Yankovic. He was raised in nearby Lynwood, California. His father, who was born in the Strawberry Hill neighborhood of Kansas City, Kansas, was of Slovene and Croatian descent: Nick Yankovic was the son of Matthew Yankovich (baptized Matija Jankovič, 1887–1969), who was born in Weidendorf, Austria-Hungary (now Bedenj, Slovenia), and Mary Yankovich (née Braj, 1890–1968), also born in Austria-Hungary (in what is now Croatia). Nick Yankovic began living in California after earning two Purple Hearts for his service as a medic during World War II. He believed "the key to success" was "doing for a living whatever makes you happy" and often reminded his son of this philosophy. Yankovic's mother, a stenographer from Kentucky of English and Italian descent, married his father in 1949. She moved to California a decade before Yankovic was born.

Yankovic's first accordion lesson, which sparked his interest in music, took place on the day before his seventh birthday. A door-to-door salesman traveling through Lynwood offered his parents a choice of accordion or guitar lessons at a local music school. Yankovic claims that his parents chose the accordion over the guitar because "they figured there should be at least one more accordion-playing Yankovic in the world"; this was in reference to Frankie Yankovic, to whom he is not related. He has also said that they chose the accordion because "they were convinced it would revolutionize rock". Since his mother did not let him outside the house often, he had plenty of time to practice the instrument at home. He continued lessons at the music school for three years before deciding to continue learning on his own.

In the 1970s, Yankovic was a big fan of Elton John and cites John's 1973 album Goodbye Yellow Brick Road as one of the reasons he "learned to play rock 'n' roll on the accordion". As for his influences in comedy and parody music, he has listed artists including Stan Freberg, Spike Jones, Tom Lehrer, Allan Sherman, Shel Silverstein, and Frank Zappa, as well as "all the other wonderfully sick and twisted artists" he found through The Dr. Demento Radio Show. Other sources of inspiration for his comedy came from Mad magazine, the British comedy troupe Monty Python, and the Zucker, Abrahams and Zucker films. He had also enjoyed George Carlin's stand-up comedy album FM & AM so much that he transcribed it by typewriter.

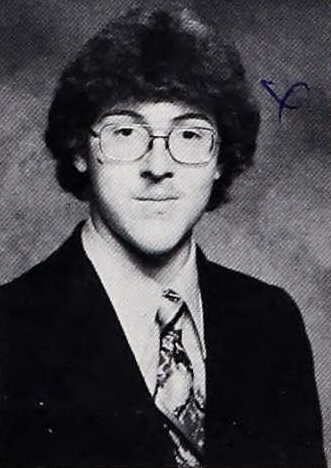
Yankovic in his Lynwood High School yearbook, Accolade 1976

Yankovic began kindergarten a year earlier than most children and skipped second grade, later saying, "My classmates seemed to think I was some kind of rocket scientist, so I was labeled a nerd early on." He attended Lynwood High School, where his unusual schooling experience meant he was two years younger than most of his classmates. He was not interested in sports or social events but was active in other extracurricular programs, including: the National Forensic League-sanctioned public speaking events; a play based on Rebel Without a Cause; the yearbook, for which he wrote most of the captions; and the Volcano Worshippers club, which he later said did "absolutely nothing" and was started "just to get an extra picture of [themselves] in the yearbook". He graduated in 1976, and was valedictorian of his senior class. He attended California Polytechnic State University in San Luis Obispo, earning a bachelor's degree in architecture. After graduation, he worked at Westwood One, first in the mail room and then calling stations confirming that paid advertisements had indeed run on air.

== Career ==
=== 1976–1981: Dr. Demento and early fame ===
Yankovic's music received its first on-air exposure via syndicated comedy radio personality Dr. Demento's Southern California–based show, later saying, "If there hadn't been a Dr. Demento, I'd probably have a real job now." Despite his mother having caught him listening to Dr. Demento's program and banning him from listening to it again, he found ways to do it discreetly. In 1976, Dr. Demento spoke at Yankovic's school, where the 16-year-old gave him a homemade cassette tape of original and parody songs on accordion and recorded in Yankovic's bedroom into a "cheesy little tape recorder". The tape's first song, "Belvedere Cruisin'" (about his family's Plymouth Belvedere), was played on Demento's radio show, launching Yankovic's career. Demento said, "Belvedere Cruisin' might not have been the very best song I ever heard, but it had some clever lines [...] I put the tape on the air immediately."

Yankovic also played at local coffeehouses, accompanied by fellow dorm resident Joel Miller on bongos. He recalled in 2007:

It was sort of like amateur music night, and a lot of people were like wannabe Dan Fogelbergs. They'd get up on stage with their acoustic guitar and do these lovely ballads. And I would get up with my accordion and play the theme from 2001. And people were kind of shocked that I would be disrupting their mellow Thursday night folk fest.

During Yankovic's second year as an architecture student at Cal Poly, San Luis Obispo, he became a disc jockey at KCPR, the university's radio station. Yankovic had been called "Weird Al" originally as a more derogatory nickname by others in his dormitory, since he was seen as the strange outcast compared to other residents. Though he initially took it as an insult, Yankovic eventually "took it on professionally" as his persona for the station. In 1978, he released his first recording (as Alfred Yankovic), "Take Me Down", on the LP Slo Grown, as a benefit for the Economic Opportunity Commission of San Luis Obispo County. The song mocked famous nearby landmarks such as Bubblegum Alley and the waterfall toilets at the Madonna Inn.

In mid-1979, shortly before his senior year, "My Sharona" by the Knack was on the charts. Yankovic took his accordion into the restroom across the hall from the radio station to take advantage of the echo chamber acoustics and recorded a parody titled "My Bologna". He sent the recording to Dr. Demento, who played it to a positive listener response. Yankovic met the Knack after a show at his college and introduced himself as the author of "My Bologna". The Knack's lead singer, Doug Fieger, said he liked the song and suggested that Capitol Records vice president Rupert Perry release it as a single. "My Bologna" was released with "School Cafeteria" as its B-side, and the label gave Yankovic a six-month recording contract. Yankovic, who was "only getting average grades" in his architecture degree, began to realize that he might make a career of comedic music.

On September 14, 1980, Yankovic was a guest on The Dr. Demento Show, where he was to record a new parody live. The song was called "Another One Rides the Bus", a parody of Queen's hit "Another One Bites the Dust". While practicing the song outside the sound booth, he met Jon "Bermuda" Schwartz, who told him he was a drummer and agreed to bang on Yankovic's accordion case to help Yankovic keep a steady beat during the song. They rehearsed the song just a few times before the show began. "Another One Rides the Bus" became so popular that Yankovic's first television appearance was a performance of the song on The Tomorrow Show with Tom Snyder on April 21, 1981. On the show, Yankovic played his accordion, and again, Schwartz banged on the accordion case and provided comical sound effects. Yankovic's record label, TK Records, went bankrupt about two weeks after the single was released, so Yankovic received no royalties from its initial release.

=== 1981–1989: Band and fame ===
In 1981, Yankovic went on tour for the first time as part of Dr. Demento's stage show. His stage act in a Phoenix, Arizona, nightclub caught the eye of manager Jay Levey, who was "blown away". Levey asked Yankovic if he had considered creating a full band and doing his music as a career. Yankovic admitted that he had, so Levey held auditions. Steve Jay became Yankovic's bass player, and Jay's friend Jim West played guitar. Schwartz continued on drums. Yankovic's first show with his new band was on March 31, 1982. Several days later, Yankovic and his band were the opening act for Missing Persons.

Yankovic recorded "I Love Rocky Road" (a parody of "I Love Rock 'n' Roll" originally recorded by The Arrows), which was produced by Rick Derringer, in 1982. The song was a hit on Top 40 radio, leading to Yankovic's signing with Scotti Brothers Records. In 1983, Yankovic's first self-titled album was released on Scotti Bros. The song "Ricky" (a parody of Toni Basil's hit "Mickey") was released as a single and the music video received exposure on the still-young MTV. "Ricky" broke the top 100 videos on MTV at the time, which Yankovic took as a sign that his career was in music, quitting his job as a mailroom clerk at the local offices of Westwood One to pursue the music career.

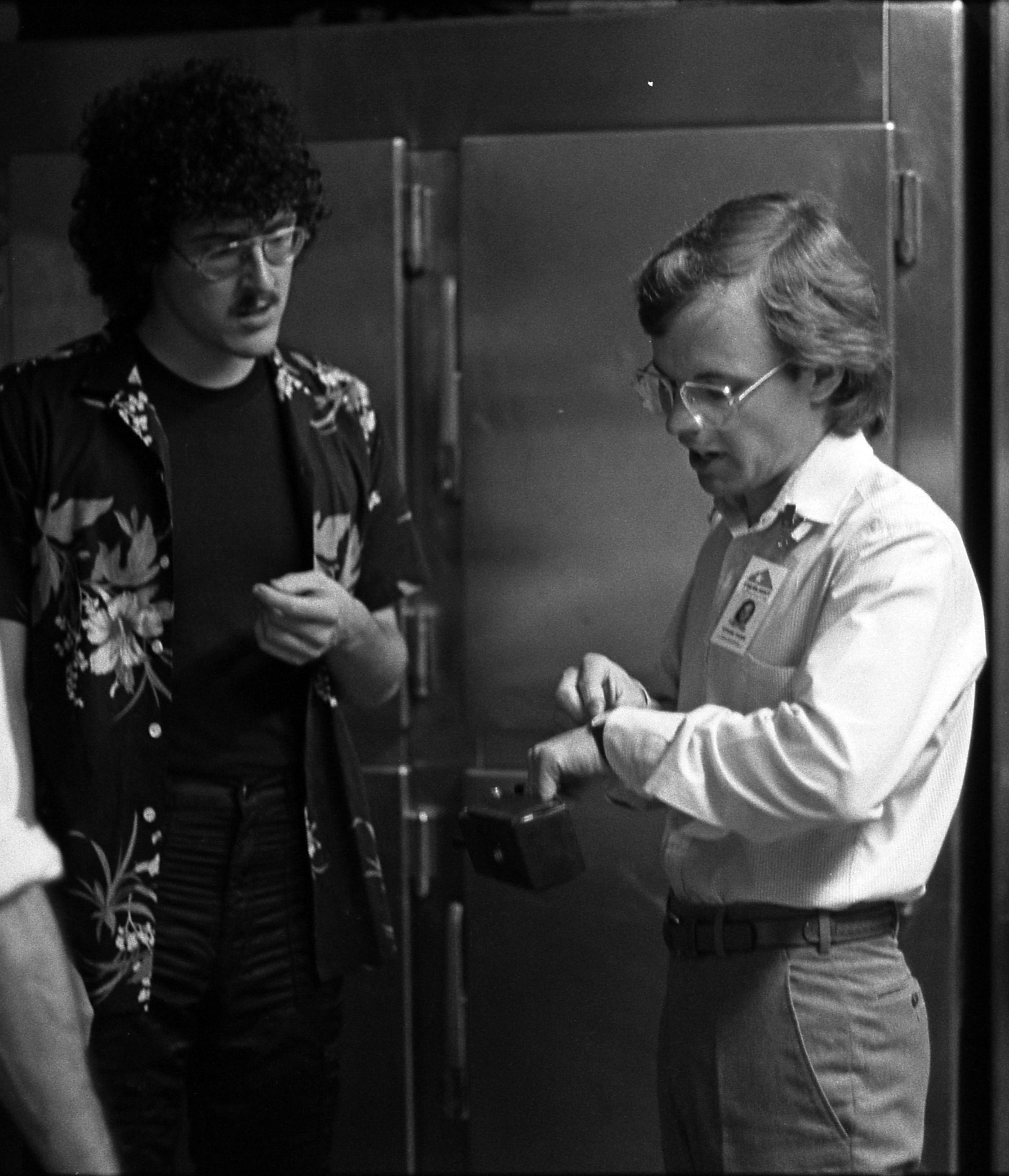
Yankovic speaking with a concert promoter before a show in 1984

Yankovic released his second album "Weird Al" Yankovic in 3-D in 1984. The first single "Eat It", a parody of the Michael Jackson song "Beat It", became popular, thanks in part to the music video, a shot-for-shot parody of Jackson's "Beat It" music video, and what Yankovic sarcastically described as his "uncanny resemblance" to Jackson. Yankovic said he felt he had become an overnight success once the video for "Eat It" aired on MTV, as both the song and video, as well as Jackson's approval for the parody, drew attention to him from other musicians and made it easier for him to obtain permissions to use others' songs. "Eat It" was also aided by the first of Yankovic's Al TV specials that aired on MTV on April 1, 1984, the network looking to Yankovic's rising popularity to help fill its programming time. Peaking at No. 12 on the Billboard Hot 100 on April 14, 1984, "Eat It" remained Yankovic's highest-charting single until "White & Nerdy" placed at No. 9 in October 2006. In Canada, "Eat It" reached No. 5.

In 1985, Yankovic co-wrote and starred in a mockumentary of his own life titled The Compleat Al (the title being a parody of the 1982 documentary The Compleat Beatles), which intertwined the facts of his life up to that point with fiction. The film also featured some clips from Yankovic's trip to Japan and some clips from the Al TV specials. The Compleat Al was co-directed by Jay Levey, who would direct UHF four years later. Also released around the same time as The Compleat Al was The Authorized Al, a biographical book based on the film. The book, resembling a scrapbook, included real and fictional humorous photographs and documents.

Yankovic and his band toured as the opening act for the Monkees in mid-1987 for their second reunion tour of North America. Yankovic claims to have enjoyed touring with the Monkees, even though he said that the promoter cheated them out of "a bunch of money". In 1988, Yankovic was the narrator on the Wendy Carlos recording of Sergei Prokofiev's Peter and the Wolf. The album also included a sequel to Camille Saint-Saëns's composition The Carnival of the Animals, titled "The Carnival of the Animals Part II", with Yankovic providing humorous poems for each of the featured creatures in the style of Ogden Nash, who had written humorous poems for the original. That year, Yankovic made his theatrical film debut with a cameo appearance in the film Tapeheads, starring as himself. This was followed by a cameo appearance in The Naked Gun: From the Files of Police Squad!, also in 1988.

Yankovic's success led to a deal to make his film UHF, which premiered in July 1989. While the film has since become a cult title, its initial release was against mediocre reviews, and it was up against several other summer blockbusters, including Indiana Jones and the Last Crusade, Ghostbusters II, Batman, and Licence to Kill. While Yankovic released an associated soundtrack album, UHF – Original Motion Picture Soundtrack and Other Stuff, it was not as successful as his previous albums. Yankovic fell into a slump over the next three years as a result of the poor performance of the film.

=== 1990–1997: Revived career ===
Yankovic had returned to the studio to prepare songs for his next album Off the Deep End around 1990. During production, Rubén Valtierra joined the band on keyboards in 1991, allowing Yankovic to concentrate more on singing and increasing his use of the stage space during concerts. Further, Yankovic took over production from Rick Derringer in 1992. While Derringer had produced six of Yankovic's previous albums, for which he won two Grammy Awards, Derringer's drug-related issues had become a problem, along with Yankovic's increasingly more complex musical vision (involving horns and other instruments).

By 1992, most of the original songs for Off the Deep End were complete, but Yankovic still did not have a strong parody and was waiting for the next big hit to work from, as he was still in a slump post-UHF. When Jackson released his next album, Dangerous, and its hit single "Black or White", Yankovic had quickly written a parody, "Snack All Night", from it, and hoped Jackson would allow him to use the parody. Jackson denied Yankovic this, as Jackson felt "Black or White" carried a serious message that would be undermined by the parody. Around this time, Nirvana and the grunge music scene began to take off. Yankovic wrote a parody of Nirvana's hit "Smells Like Teen Spirit", "Smells Like Nirvana", and was able to secure the band's permission for the parody; Nirvana's lead singer Kurt Cobain reportedly said that getting Yankovic to parody their work was a sign their band had "made it". "Smells Like Nirvana" became the lead song on Off the Deep End, landing at No. 35 on the Billboard charts, his second top-40 hit in the United States. Off the Deep End reached No. 17 on the Billboard 200, and helped to revitalize Yankovic's career after the failure of UHF.

Yankovic's next two studio albums were modest successes in light of Off the Deep End. Alapalooza was released in 1993, and led with "Jurassic Park", a spoof of "MacArthur Park" by Richard Harris while mocking the 1993 film of the same name. Alapalooza peaked at No. 46 on the Billboard 200. Bad Hair Day in 1996 headlined with "Amish Paradise", a parody of Coolio's "Gangsta's Paradise". "Amish Paradise" reached No. 53 on the top Billboard Hot 100 singles, while the album reached No. 14 on the Billboard 200, and eventually was certified double platinum in sales by RIAA, making it one of Yankovic's more successful works.

In addition, Yankovic released a number of compilation works during this period, including Permanent Record: Al in the Box, a four-CD collection which included most of Yankovic's previous works as well as an informational booklet with contributions from Dr. Demento. Other compilations included Greatest Hits Volume II, a collection of songs that were not included on Permanent Record, and The TV Album, featuring songs loosely based on television shows.

=== 1998–2014: Reinvention ===
On January 23, 1998, Yankovic had LASIK eye surgery to correct his extreme myopia. Yankovic had the surgery for free when he agreed to let KTLA Morning News broadcast it live on television. When Running with Scissors debuted in 1999, he unveiled a radically changed look. In addition to shedding his glasses, he had shaved off his moustache and grown out his hair. He had previously shaved his moustache in 1983 for the video of "Ricky" to resemble Desi Arnaz, in 1989 for segments of the "UHF" music video and in 1996 for the "Amish Paradise" video. Yankovic reasoned, "If Madonna's allowed to reinvent herself every 15 minutes, I figure I should be good for a change at least once every couple of decades." He parodied the reaction to this "new look" in a commercial for his nonexistent MTV Unplugged special. The commercial featured Yankovic in the short-haired wig from the music video for Hanson's "River", claiming his new look was an attempt to "get back to the core of what I'm all about", that being "the music".

Running with Scissors was followed by his next studio album Poodle Hat in 2003. Poodle Hat was met with mixed reviews without any standout singles, although the album peaked at number 17 on the Billboard 200. Yankovic's following album was Straight Outta Lynwood in 2006, which featured the single "White & Nerdy", a parody of "Ridin'" by Chamillionaire. "White & Nerdy" became Yankovic's first Billboard Top Ten single, debuting at No. 29 and peaking at No. 9. "Canadian Idiot", a parody of "American Idiot" by Green Day, also charted in the Hot 100. The album as a whole reached No. 10 in the Billboard 200, and by 2008 was Yankovic's first certified platinum album, having reached over one million sales.

Following Straight Out of Lynwood, Yankovic started to explore digital distribution of his songs. On October 7, 2008, Yankovic released to the iTunes Store "Whatever You Like", a parody of the T.I. song of the same title, which Yankovic said he had come up with two weeks before. Yankovic said that the benefit of digital distribution is that "I don't have to wait around while my songs get old and dated—I can get them out on the Internet almost immediately." In 2009, Yankovic released four more songs: "Craigslist" on June 16, "Skipper Dan" on July 14, "CNR" on August 4, and "Ringtone" on August 25. These five digitally released songs were packaged as a digital EP titled Internet Leaks, with "Whatever You Like" retroactively included in the set.

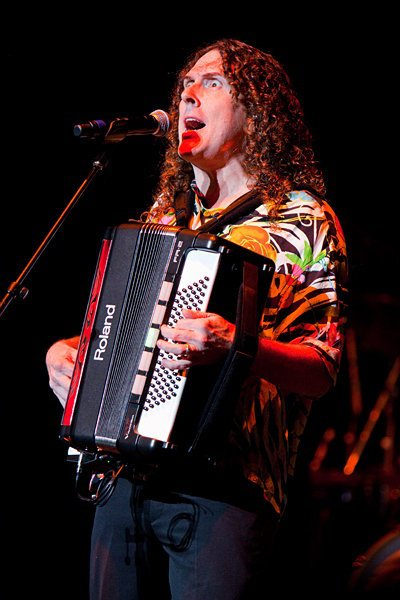
Yankovic performing in 2011

In 2011, Yankovic completed his thirteenth studio album, titled Alpocalypse, which was released on June 21, 2011. The album contains the five songs from the previous Internet Leaks digital download release, a polka medley called "Polka Face", a song called "TMZ", for which Bill Plympton created an animated music video, and five other new songs.

Yankovic had reported an interest in parodying Lady Gaga's material, and on April 20 announced that he had written and recorded a parody of "Born This Way" titled "Perform This Way" to be the lead single for his new album. However, upon first submitting it to Lady Gaga's manager for approval (which Yankovic does as a courtesy), he was not given permission to release it commercially. As he had previously done under similar circumstances (with his parody of James Blunt's "You're Beautiful", which was titled "You're Pitiful"), Yankovic then released the song for free on the internet. Soon afterwards, Gaga's manager admitted that he had denied the parody of his own accord without forwarding the song to his client, and upon seeing it online, Lady Gaga granted permission for the parody. Yankovic has stated that all of his proceeds from the parody and its music video will be donated to the Human Rights Campaign, to support the human rights themes of the original song. Yankovic was also a judge for the 10th annual Independent Music Awards to support independent artists' careers.

Yankovic stated in September 2013 that he was working on a new album, and in 2014, he used social media websites to hint at a July 15 release of the new album. The album artwork and title, Mandatory Fun, were confirmed by his publisher. Mandatory Fun was released to strong critical praise and was the No. 1 debut album on the Billboard charts the week of its release, buoyed by Yankovic's approach for releasing eight music videos over eight continuous days that drew viral attention to the album as described below. It became Yankovic's first No. 1 album. Additionally, the song "Word Crimes" (a parody of Robin Thicke's "Blurred Lines") reached No. 39 on the Top 100 singles for the same week; this is Yankovic's fourth Top 40 single (following "Eat It", "Smells Like Nirvana", and "White & Nerdy") and made him the third musical artist, after Michael Jackson and Madonna, to have a Top 40 single in each decade since the 1980s.

=== 2015–present: Transition from studio albums ===
In an interview promoting Mandatory Fun, Yankovic said that, with the end of his recording contract, he was unlikely to release any more albums, in the sense of recording and releasing that many songs at a time. Instead, he said he would likely switch to releasing singles and EPs over the Internet, allowing him to release music faster, particularly parodies that can quickly become dated.

He has released no albums, and indeed, few songs, since Mandatory Fun. In a 2017 interview, he told Rolling Stone, "I can't tell you when any material is coming out. Inspiration could strike tomorrow and I might have something out next month. There's no plan. It's just going to be whenever it winds up being."

After several years of fan-driven campaigns, Yankovic received a star on the Hollywood Walk of Fame in 2018.

In March 2018, Yankovic released "The Hamilton Polka", a medley of several songs from the musical Hamilton written by Lin-Manuel Miranda. Yankovic and Miranda had met and become friends before the latter's work on Hamilton and had discussed a possible music project together. After the success of Hamilton, Miranda provided Yankovic the score from the musical, hoping that Yankovic would create a few singles from it, but Yankovic ultimately created a full polka medley. The song was the first polka to chart on Billboard's Digital Songs Sales Chart. After Hamilton premiered on Disney+ in July 2020, Yankovic released a video version of "The Hamilton Polka" that synched his song to video clips from the show. Also in March, Yankovic released two remixes of songs by Portugal. The Man: "Feel It Still" and "Live in the Moment". In 2020, he collaborated with the band on their single "Who's Gonna Stop Me", which was released for Indigenous Peoples' Day.

Since Mandatory Fun, Yankovic has focused less on new songs than on projects such as his tours and the 2022 parody biopic Weird: The Al Yankovic Story. That year, Yankovic told the Los Angeles Times that he was not writing many new parodies because it had become harder to tell which new songs would be big hits, due to what the newspaper described as popular music trending more towards "micro-niche[s]" than a "monoculture". Yankovic released a new polka medley, "Polkamania!", on July 19, 2024, featuring his take on "Flowers", "Bad Guy", and "Old Town Road", among others. Because he had not released a polka in ten years, he considered this the opportunity to include his "white whales", though limited the songs to those that reached No. 1 on the Billboard charts. The single included the release of video created by several animators that Yankovic had worked with in past videos, such as Bill Plympton, Augenblick Studios, Liam Lynch, and Jarrett Heather as well as new collaborations with artists like Cyriak and Vivienne Medrano.

Yankovic co-headlined Riot Fest in September 2025 Chicago along with Green Day, Blink-182, Jack White, Weezer, and Idles.

Yankovic said he had turned down a seven-figure offer to perform at the 2025 Riyadh Comedy Festival, saying that "I'm doing enough that I don't need to take any amount of money if it makes me feel icky, and that kind of did."

== Personal life ==
Yankovic married Suzanne Krajewski, a marketing executive with 20th Century Fox, after they met in 2001. They were introduced to each other on a blind date by their mutual friend Bill Mumy. Their daughter, Nina, was born in 2003. They live in Los Angeles, where they own a house previously owned by writer Jack S. Margolis and rapper Heavy D. In contrast to his stage persona, Yankovic is known by friends and associates to be polite, shy, and introverted, even among family. He is a Christian, and a married couple from the church he attends can be seen in the background on the cover of his album Poodle Hat. His religious upbringing is reflected in his abstinence from profanity, alcohol, and drugs.

On April 9, 2004, Yankovic's parents were found dead at their home in Fallbrook, California, the victims of accidental carbon monoxide poisoning from their fireplace. Hours after his wife notified him of this, he made the decision to go on with his concert in Appleton, Wisconsin. He later said, "Since my music had helped many of my fans through tough times, maybe it would work for me as well ... it would at least give me a break from sobbing all the time." Their deaths occurred following the release of Poodle Hat, which was Yankovic's lowest-selling album in 20 years. He considered the Appleton show and subsequent tour dates therapeutic: "If I didn't have anything to distract me, I probably would have spiraled into an even deeper depression. For a couple of hours each night, I could go onstage and put on a big fake smile and pretend like everything was just okay." In a 2014 interview, he cited the deaths of his parents as the worst thing that had ever happened to him, adding, "I knew intellectually, that at some point, probably, I'd have to, you know, live through the death of my parents, but I never thought it would be at the same time, and so abruptly."

Yankovic became a vegetarian in 1992 when his girlfriend gave him a copy of the 1987 John Robbins book Diet for a New America, which he said "made a very compelling argument for a strict vegetarian diet". When asked how he can rationalize performing shows at events such as the Great American Rib Cook-Off as a vegetarian, he replied, "The same way I can rationalize playing at a college even though I'm not a student anymore." In a 2011 interview with OnMilwaukee, he clarified his stance on his diet, "I am still a vegetarian, and I try to be a vegan, but I occasionally cheat. If there's a cheese pizza on the band bus, I might sneak a piece."

In 1998, Yankovic underwent LASIK eye surgery to correct his near-sightedness. As his glasses were part of his signature look prior to the surgery, Yankovic considered wearing fake glasses but decided against it. Around this time, he had also decided to shave off his trademark mustache.

== Musical style ==
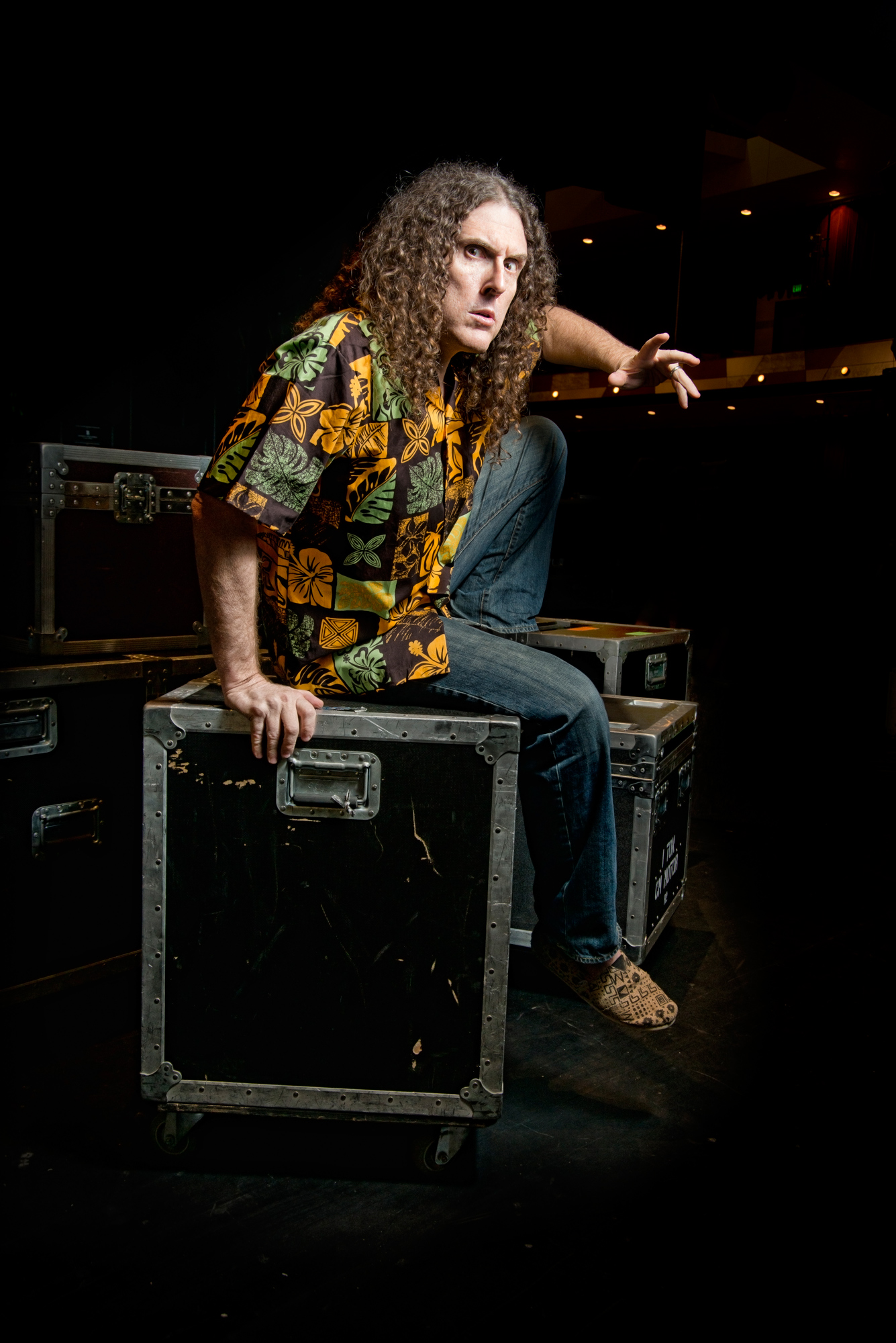
Yankovic, photographed by Kyle Cassidy

=== Parodies ===
Yankovic is well known for creating parodies of contemporary radio hits, which typically make up about half of his studio releases. Unlike other parody artists such as Allan Sherman, Yankovic and his band strive to keep the backing music in his parodies the same as the original, transcribing the original song by ear and re-recording the song for the parody. In some cases, after Yankovic has requested that the original band allow his parody, the band will offer to help out with the recreation: Dire Straits members Mark Knopfler and Guy Fletcher perform on "Money for Nothing/Beverly Hillbillies*", Yankovic's parody of Dire Straits' "Money for Nothing", while Imagine Dragons provided Yankovic with advice on how to recreate some of the electronic sounds they used for "Radioactive" in Yankovic's parody "Inactive". Yankovic's career in novelty and comedy music has outlasted many of his "mainstream" parody targets, such as Toni Basil, MC Hammer, and Men Without Hats. Yankovic's continued success (including the top 10 single "White & Nerdy" and album Straight Outta Lynwood in 2006) has enabled him to escape the one-hit wonder stigma often associated with novelty music.

Yankovic considers his body of work to primarily feature parodies, rather than satires of the original song or artist, as he found that satire of songs or artists has already been done before. Most Yankovic songs consist of the original song's music, with a separate, unrelated set of amusing lyrics. Yankovic's humor normally lies more in creating unexpected incongruity between an artist's image and the topic of the song, contrasting the style of the song with its content (such as the songs "Amish Paradise", "White & Nerdy", and "You're Pitiful"), or in pointing out trends or works which have become pop culture clichés (such as "eBay" and "Don't Download This Song"). Yankovic's parodies are often satirical of popular culture, including television (see The TV Album), films ("The Saga Begins"), and food (see The Food Album). Yankovic claims he has no intention of writing "serious" music. In his reasoning, "There's enough people that do unfunny music. I'll leave the serious stuff to Paris Hilton and Kevin Federline."

Yankovic considered that his first true satirical song was "Smells Like Nirvana", which references unintelligible lyrics in Nirvana's "Smells Like Teen Spirit". Other satirical songs include "Achy Breaky Song", which refers to the song "Achy Breaky Heart", "(This Song's Just) Six Words Long", which refers to the repetitious lyrics in "Got My Mind Set on You", and "Perform This Way", set to Lady Gaga's "Born This Way", that drew inspiration from Lady Gaga's outlandish but confident attitude.

Yankovic is the sole writer for all his songs and, for "legal and personal reasons", does not accept parody submissions or ideas from fans. There exists, however, one exception to this rule: Madonna was reportedly talking with a friend and rhetorically asked when Yankovic was going to turn her "Like a Virgin" into "Like a Surgeon". Madonna's friend was a mutual friend of Yankovic's manager, Jay Levey, and eventually Yankovic himself heard the story from Levey. In writing his parodies as well as his original songs, Yankovic spends a great deal of time in deciding the right words that not only match the beat of the original song but that fit the theme of the parody. He says that the lyrics of some songs have taken him weeks to write as he permutes the various choices, sometimes entering a "zombie phase" as he mulls these over in his home. For example, Yankovic believes he could have written a completely different version of "White & Nerdy" based on the alternative choices of lyrics he had come up with and had discarded for the final song. He has also done significant research for other song parodies to get facts and keywords for certain areas of knowledge, such as for "I Think I'm a Clone Now" or hospitals for "Like a Surgeon". Yankovic has documented all these past lyrical attempts, first through binders and then computerized in case he needs to go back for future songs.

=== Polka medleys ===
Most of Yankovic's studio albums include a polka medley of about a dozen contemporary songs at the time of the album, with the choruses or memorable lines of various songs juxtaposed for humorous effect. In Yankovic's early career, before recording his first album, he had performed such polka medleys in live shows in California, though then using songs from lesser-known bands like Bad Brains and the Plasmatics. He had been inspired to do so from Spike Jones, who had transitioned from classical music into polka. Yankovic said that converting these songs to polka was "...the way God intended". Yankovic did not include a medley on his first album, but considered this for his second, In 3-D, recognizing that it would only work if he used well-known songs. The resulting "Polkas on 45", which featured songs from Devo, Deep Purple, Berlin, and The Beatles, was popular, and the polka medley became a staple of all but one of Yankovic's future albums. Yankovic said that "fans would be rioting in the streets, I think, if I didn't do a polka medley." More current polka medleys feature songs that Yankovic had wanted to parody but which had proved difficult, such as Daft Punk's "Get Lucky", which lacked sufficient lyrics to parody. The polkas are recorded in studio, including the sound effects which are performed live during recording, which Yankovic considered one of his favorite parts of recording. In 2018, Yankovic created a medley of songs from the musical Hamilton, "The Hamilton Polka".

=== Original songs ===
Yankovic has recorded numerous original humorous songs, such as "You Don't Love Me Anymore" and "One More Minute". Many of these songs are style pastiches of specific bands with allusions to specific songs. For example, "First World Problems" from Mandatory Fun is a style take on Pixies, with the opening stanza reminiscent of Pixies' "Debaser". Other style parodies includes those of Rage Against the Machine with "I'll Sue Ya" (which features many aspects of the hit song "Killing in the Name"), Devo with "Dare to Be Stupid", The B-52's with "Mr. Popeil", Talking Heads with "Dog Eat Dog", Frank Zappa with "Genius in France", Nine Inch Nails with "Germs", and Queen with "Ringtone". Some songs are pastiches of an overall genre of music, rather than a specific band (for example, country music with "Good Enough For Now", charity records with "Don't Download This Song" and college fight songs with "Sports Song"). Yankovic stated that he does not have any unreleased original songs, instead coming up and committing to the song ideas he arrives at for his albums and other releases.

Yankovic has contributed original songs to several films ("This Is the Life" from Johnny Dangerously; "Polkamon" from the film Pokémon: The Movie 2000; and a parody of the James Bond title sequence in Spy Hard), in addition to his own film, UHF. Other songs of his have appeared in films or television series as well, such as "Dare to Be Stupid" in The Transformers: The Movie. In 2017, Yankovic made a guest appearance on Last Week Tonight with John Oliver, performing a new song "The North Korea Polka", as part of an episode about the political state of North Korea.

Since around 2015, most of Yankovic's output was his original works rather than parodies, with Yankovic explaining "I wanted to prove that I'm more than just the parody guy", and that there was more challenge in creating original works and pastiches.

=== Covers ===
While not part of his studio albums, Yankovic has been known to perform cover versions of existing songs. One of the earlier known examples is "Shaving Creme" by Benny Bell, popularized by Dr. Demento's own take on it. Other known earlier covers include The Who's "My Generation" and Jethro Tull's "Aqualung" during the 1980s. As Yankovic shifted from studio albums to touring around 2018, covers became a larger part of his concerts alongside his own songs, including George Harrison's "What is Life", The Turtles' "Happy Together", and Paul Simon's "You Can Call Me Al" as part of his regular setlist during the Bigger & Weirder Tour.

=== Recurring themes ===
One of Yankovic's recurring jokes involves the number 27. It is mentioned in the lyrics of several songs, and seen on the covers for Running with Scissors, Poodle Hat and Straight Outta Lynwood. He had originally just pulled the number 27 as a random figure to use in filling out lyrics, but as his fans started to notice the reuse of the number after the first few times, he began to use 27 in his lyrics, videos, and album covers. He explains that "It's just a number I started using that people started attaching a lot of importance to."

Other recurring jokes revolve around the names Bob (the Al TV interviews often mention the name, David Bowe's character in UHF is named Bob, and a song called "Bob", which parodies Subterranean Homesick Blues by Bob Dylan, is featured on Poodle Hat), Frank (e.g. "Frank's 2000" TV"), and the surname "Finkelstein" (e.g. the music video for "I Lost on Jeopardy", or Fran Drescher's character, Pamela Finkelstein, in UHF). A number of songs use the phrase "internal organs". A hamster called Harvey the Wonder Hamster is a recurring character in The Weird Al Show and the Al TV specials, as well as the subject of an original song on Alapalooza. Other recurring jokes include Yankovic borrowing or being owed $5. In a number of Al TV interviews, he often asks if he can borrow $5, being turned down every time. This motif also occurs in "Why Does This Always Happen to Me?", in which his deceased friend owes him $5. Another recurring joke is his attraction to female nostrils or nostrils in general. This also appears in numerous Al TV interviews as well as in several of his songs (such as "Albuquerque" and "Wanna B Ur Lovr"). Yankovic also asks his celebrity guests if they could "shave his back for a nickel". This also appears in the song "Albuquerque". Yankovic has also put two backmasking messages into his songs. The first, in "Nature Trail to Hell", said "Satan Eats Cheez Whiz"; the second, in "I Remember Larry", said "Wow, you must have an awful lot of free time on your hands."

=== Music videos ===
While the lyrics of Yankovic's musical parodies generally do not allude to the subject songs or artists, his music videos sometimes parody their videos. The video for "Smells Like Nirvana" uses a set that closely resembles that of the video for Nirvana's "Smells Like Teen Spirit" and uses several of the same actors. This video contended with "Smells like Teen Spirit" at the 1992 MTV Video Music Awards for Best Male Video. Other videos that draw directly from those of the original song include "Eat It", "Fat", "Money for Nothing/Beverly Hillbillies*", "Bedrock Anthem", "Bob", "Headline News", "It's All About the Pentiums", "Amish Paradise", "Like a Surgeon", and "White & Nerdy". Yankovic has said the video for "Dare to Be Stupid" parodies Devo videos in general.

Several videos include celebrity cameos. Dr. Demento appeared in several of Yankovic's earlier videos, such as "I Love Rocky Road" and "Ricky". Actor Dick Van Patten is featured in "Smells Like Nirvana" and "Bedrock Anthem"; Drew Carey, Emo Philips and Phil LaMarr appeared in "It's All About the Pentiums"; Keegan-Michael Key, Jordan Peele, Donny Osmond, Judy Tenuta and Seth Green appeared in "White & Nerdy"; and Ruth Buzzi and Pat Boone appeared in "Gump". The video for "I Lost on Jeopardy" includes Greg Kihn, the artist whose song, "Jeopardy", was being parodied, along with Don Pardo and Art Fleming, Jeopardy's original announcer and host, as themselves. Florence Henderson plays an Amish seductress in "Amish Paradise".

While most videos that Yankovic creates are aired on music channels such as MTV and VH1, Yankovic worked with animation artists to create music videos for release with extended content albums. The DualDisc version of Straight Outta Lynwood features six videos set to songs from the release, including videos created by Bill Plympton and John Kricfalusi; one video, "Weasel Stomping Day" was created by the producers of the show Robot Chicken, and aired as a segment of that program. For the 2010 Alpocalypse, Yankovic produced videos for every song; four of those were previously released for each of the songs on the EP Internet Leaks, with the videos for the remaining songs released via social media sites and included in the deluxe edition of Alpocalypse. These live-action and animated videos were produced by both previous collaborators such as Plympton for "TMZ", video content providers like Jib-Jab and SuperNews!, and other directors and animators.

To help promote his 2014 album Mandatory Fun in social media circles, Yankovic produced eight music videos for the album releasing them over eight consecutive days with release of the album, believing it "would make an impact because people would be talking about the album all week long". RCA Records opted not to fund production of any of these videos, and Yankovic turned to various social media portals including Funny or Die and CollegeHumor which he had worked with in the past; these sites helped to cover the production cost of the videos with Yankovic foregoing any ad video revenue. He chose to distribute the videos to different portals to avoid burdening any single one with all of the costs and work needed to produce them. This approach proved to be successful, as the total collection of videos had acquired more than 20 million views in the first week. This release strategy was considered by The Atlantic as a "web-enabled precision video delivery operation, and evidence of some serious digital distributional forethought" as it allows the videos to be seen by different sets of audiences for each site. The approach was considered to be essential to promoting Mandatory Fun to reach the No. 1 position on the Billboard charts on its debut week. Businessweek attributed the sales success of Mandatory Fun to the viral music video campaign. ABC World News elaborated that Yankovic's success is in part due to the Internet's interest in viral and humorous videos catching up with what Yankovic has been doing for his entire career. Yankovic himself was amazed with the response he got from the album and video releases, stating that "I've been doing the same thing for 30 years and all of a sudden I'm having the best week of my life" and that he "kind of stumbled on my formula for the future".

In 2025, Yankovic announced the Bigger & Weirder Tour, a concert tour featuring performances at large venues such as Madison Square Garden and the Kia Forum. Following the release of his album Mandatory Fun in 2014, Yankovic has released limited new music, but the tour has seen strong ticket sales, marking it as one of his most commercially successful to date. The tour includes elaborate performances with approximately 20 costume changes for Yankovic and nine for his band, each completed in 45 seconds or less.

=== Reactions from original artists ===
The United States Supreme Court affirmed in the 1994 case Campbell v. Acuff-Rose Music, Inc. that certain parodies (even those sold commercially) can qualify under the fair use provision of U.S. copyright law, which means that parody musicians such as Yankovic do not need to obtain permission from the original artists. However, as a personal rule, Yankovic has always sought permission from the original artist before commercially releasing a parody, to respect the original musicians, avoid lawsuits, and to work out agreeable royalty arrangements. Yankovic stated of these efforts: "I don't want to hurt anybody's feelings. I don't want to be embroiled in any nastiness. That's not how I live my life. I like everybody to be in on the joke and be happy for my success. I take pains not to burn bridges." The communications are typically handled by his manager Jay Levey, but at times Yankovic has asked the artist directly, such as flying to Denver, Colorado, to attend an Iggy Azalea concert and speak to her personally about parodying her song "Fancy". He claims that only about two to three percent of the artists he approaches for permission deny his requests. Yankovic has stated that the holder of the publishing rights to the original song holds the publishing rights/royalties to his parodies, but that he works out an agreement to split the songwriting credit with the original songwriters.

Separately, Yankovic needs to negotiate for royalties to the original artists for including their songs within a polka medley, which is considered a cover in copyright law. This created difficulties in recording his first medley, "Polkas on 45", since it involved thirteen different royalty schemes, but since then, he has established a relationship with most large music publishers to easily secure the license to use their songs.

==== Positive ====
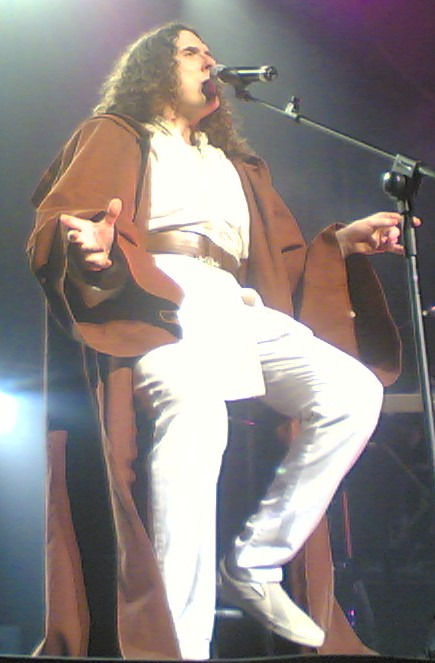
Yankovic performing "The Saga Begins" in Auckland, New Zealand, on March 10, 2007. Both Don McLean and George Lucas have reportedly expressed approval of the parody.

Many artists parodied by Yankovic have considered this as a rite of passage to show they have made it in the music industry.

Michael Jackson was a big fan of Yankovic, and Yankovic claimed Jackson "had always been very supportive" of his work. Jackson twice allowed him to parody his songs ("Beat It" and "Bad" became "Eat It" and "Fat", respectively). When Jackson granted Yankovic permission to do "Fat", Jackson allowed him to use the same set built for his own "Badder" video from the Moonwalker film. Yankovic said that Jackson's support helped to gain approval from other artists he wanted to parody. Though Jackson allowed the first two parodies to be made, he requested that Yankovic not record a parody of "Black or White", titled "Snack All Night", because he felt the message was too important. This refusal, coming shortly after the commercial failure of Yankovic's film UHF in theaters, had initially set Yankovic back; he later recognized this as a critical time as, while searching for new parodies, he came across Nirvana, leading to a revitalization of his career with "Smells Like Nirvana". Yankovic has performed a concert-only parody "Snack All Night" in some of his live shows. Yankovic was one of several celebrities who appeared in the 1989 music video for Jackson's song "Liberian Girl".

Dave Grohl of Nirvana said that the band felt they had "made it" after Yankovic recorded "Smells Like Nirvana", a parody of the grunge band's smash hit, "Smells Like Teen Spirit". On his Behind the Music special, Yankovic stated that when he called Nirvana frontman Kurt Cobain to ask if he could parody the song, Cobain gave him permission, then paused and asked, "Um... it's not gonna be about food, is it?" Yankovic responded with, "No, it'll be about how no one can understand your lyrics." According to Nirvana bassist Krist Novoselic interviewed for Behind the Music, when the band saw the video of the song, they were laughing hysterically. Additionally, Cobain described Yankovic as "America's modern pop-rock genious [sic]" in his posthumously released personal notebook.

Mark Knopfler approved Yankovic's parody of the Dire Straits song "Money for Nothing" for use in the film UHF on the provision that Knopfler himself be allowed to play lead guitar on the parody which was later titled "Money for Nothing/Beverly Hillbillies*". Yankovic commented on the legal complications of the parody in the DVD audio commentary for UHF, explaining "We had to name that song 'Money for Nothing "slash" Beverly Hillbillies "asterisk"' because the lawyers told us that had to be the name. Those wacky lawyers! What ya gonna do?" The Permanent Record: Al in the Box booklet referred to the song's "compound fracture of a title". When a fan asked about the song's title, Yankovic shared his feelings on the title, replying "That incredibly stupid name is what the lawyers insisted that the parody be listed as. I'm not sure why, and I've obviously never been very happy about it."

The Presidents of the United States of America were so pleased with "Gump", Yankovic's parody of their song "Lump", that they ended the song with his last line instead of their own ("And that's all I have to say about that") on the live recording of "Lump" featured on the compilation album Pure Frosting. In 2008, Yankovic directed the music video for their song "Mixed Up S.O.B."

Don McLean was reportedly pleased with "The Saga Begins", a parody of "American Pie" that summarizes Star Wars: Episode I – The Phantom Menace, and told Yankovic that the parody's lyrics sometimes enter his mind during live performances. His parody not only replicates the music from the original McLean song, but it replicates the multi-layered rhyming structure in the verses and chorus. Additionally, George Lucas loved the song and a Lucasfilm representative told Yankovic, "You should have seen the smile on his face."

Chamillionaire was also very pleased, even putting Yankovic's parody "White & Nerdy" (a parody of "Ridin'") on his official MySpace page before it was on Yankovic's own page. Chamillionaire stated in an interview, "He's actually rapping pretty good on it, it's crazy [...] I didn't know he could rap like that. It's really an honor when he does that. [...] Weird Al is not gonna do a parody of your song if you're not doing it big." In September 2007, Chamillionaire credited "White & Nerdy" for his recent Grammy win, stating "That parody was the reason I won the Grammy, because it made the record so big it was undeniable. It was so big overseas that people were telling me they had heard my version of Weird Al's song."

In 2011, Yankovic was initially denied permission to parody Lady Gaga's "Born This Way" for his song "Perform This Way" for release on a new album, but through his release of the song on YouTube and subsequent spread via Twitter, Lady Gaga and her staff asserted that her manager had made the decision without her input, and Gaga herself gave Yankovic permission to proceed with the parody's release. Gaga considered herself "a huge Weird Al fan", and she stated that the parody was a "rite of passage" for her musical career and considered the song "very empowering".

Yankovic states that his style parodies have also been met with positive remarks by the original artist. He noted that his friends and fellow musicians Ben Folds and Taylor Hanson helped to support their respective style parodies "Why Does This Always Happen To Me?" and "If That Isn't Love". He also noted positive reactions he got from friends his band members have, such as from Frank Black of Pixies for "First World Problems" and Southern Culture on the Skids for "Lame Claim to Fame", and a similar praise when he encountered Graham Nash of Crosby, Stills, and Nash on the street, and was able to play his recently completed "Mission Statement" for him.

==== Negative ====
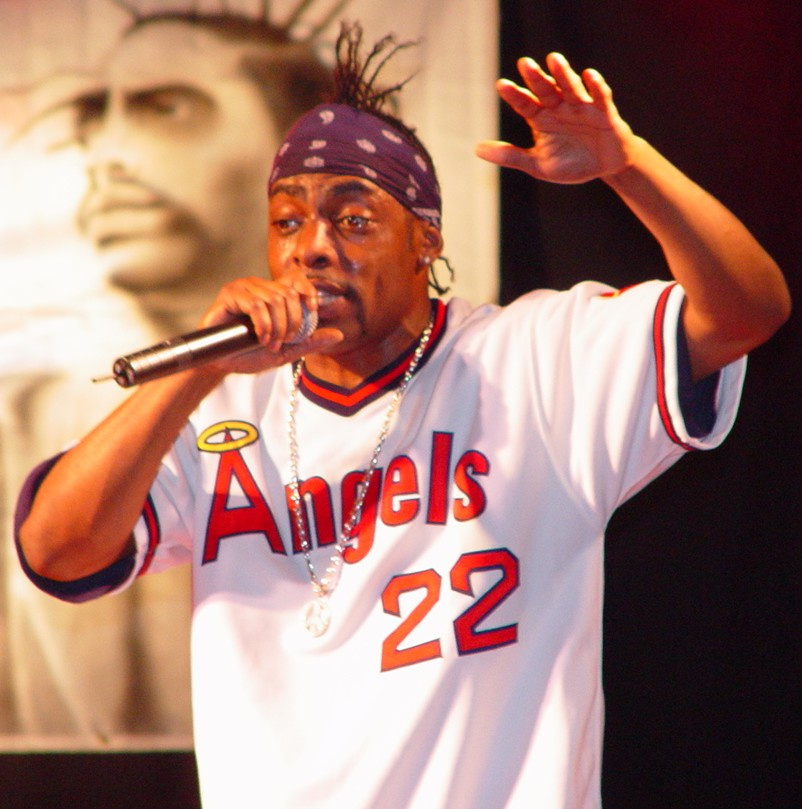
Coolio initially reacted negatively to "Amish Paradise", feeling it undermined the serious message of the original song, but later apologized and said he considered Yankovic's parody "actually funny as shit".

One of Yankovic's most controversial parodies was 1996's "Amish Paradise", based on "Gangsta's Paradise" by hip-hop artist Coolio, which, in turn, was based on "Pastime Paradise" by Stevie Wonder. Reportedly, Coolio's label gave Yankovic the impression that Coolio had granted permission to record the parody, but Coolio maintained that he never did. While Coolio claimed he was upset, legal action never materialized, and Coolio accepted royalty payments for the song. After this controversy, Yankovic has always made sure to speak directly with the artist of every song he parodied. At the XM Satellite Radio booth at the 2006 Consumer Electronics Show, Yankovic and Coolio made peace. On his website, Yankovic wrote of this event, "I don't remember what we said to each other exactly, but it was all very friendly. I doubt I'll be invited to Coolio's next birthday party, but at least I can stop wearing that bulletproof vest to the mall." In an interview in 2014, Coolio extended his apology for refusing his permission, stating that at the time "I was being cocky and shit and being stupid and I was wrong and I should've embraced that shit and went with it", and that he considered Yankovic's parody "actually funny as shit".

In 1999, Red Hot Chili Peppers bassist Flea told Behind the Music that he was unimpressed and disappointed by Yankovic's 1993 song "Bedrock Anthem", which parodied the band's songs "Under the Bridge" and "Give It Away". He was quoted as stating, "I didn't think it was very good. I enjoy Weird Al's things, but I found it unimaginative."

==== Refused parodies ====
On numerous occasions, Prince refused Yankovic permission to record parodies of his songs. Yankovic had stated in interviews prior to Prince's death in 2016 that he had "approached him every few years [to] see if he's lightened up". Yankovic told one story where, before the American Music Awards where he and Prince were assigned to sit in the same row, he received a telegram from Prince's management company, demanding he not even make eye contact with the artist. Among parodies that Yankovic had ideas for included one based on "Let's Go Crazy" about The Beverly Hillbillies, "Yellow Snow" as a parody of "Purple Rain", "1999" as an infomercial with a call-in number ending in −1999, and parodies of "Kiss" and "When Doves Cry". Despite these refusals, Yankovic was able to gain permission to parody the "When Doves Cry" video as part of his music video for the song "UHF". He later wrote "Traffic Jam" for his album Alapalooza, in the style of "Let's Go Crazy", without Prince's express permission.

Led Zeppelin guitarist Jimmy Page is a self-proclaimed Yankovic fan, but when Yankovic suggested the idea of creating a polka medley of Led Zeppelin songs, Page was "less than thrilled with the prospect, so [Yankovic] didn't pursue it". Yankovic was, however, allowed the opportunity to re-record a sample of "Black Dog" for a segment of "Trapped in the Drive-Thru".

Paul McCartney, also a Yankovic fan, refused Yankovic permission to record a parody of Wings' "Live and Let Die", titled "Chicken Pot Pie", because, according to Yankovic, McCartney is "a strict vegetarian and he didn't want a parody that condoned the consumption of animal flesh". Though McCartney suggested possibly changing the parody to "Tofu Pot Pie", Yankovic, who is also a vegetarian, found this would not fit the lyrics he had written, which featured the sound of a chicken throughout the chorus. While never recorded for an album, Yankovic did play parts of "Chicken Pot Pie" as part of a larger medley in several tours during the 1990s.

In 2003, Yankovic was denied permission to make a video for "Couch Potato", his parody of Eminem's "Lose Yourself". Yankovic believes that Eminem thought that the video would be harmful to his image.

In 2006, Yankovic gained James Blunt's permission to record a parody of "You're Beautiful". However, after Yankovic had recorded "You're Pitiful", Blunt's label, Atlantic Records, rescinded this permission, despite Blunt's personal approval of the song. The parody was pulled from Yankovic's Straight Outta Lynwood because of his label's unwillingness to "go to war" with Atlantic. Yankovic released the song as a free download on his MySpace profile, as well as his official website, and plays it in concert, since it was not Blunt himself objecting to the parody. Yankovic referenced the incident in his video for "White & Nerdy" when he depicts himself vandalizing Atlantic Records' Wikipedia article.

Yankovic was considering a complete polka medley with only U2 songs, but the band's publisher did not accept the terms. Similarly, he had included Weezer's "Buddy Holly" in a polka medley, but had to pull it when the band's publisher refused to receive partial rates.

Yankovic had approached Beck asking for permission to parody his song "Loser", which Yankovic had created called "Schmoozer". At the time, Beck was just entering the music industry, and did not want his reputation to be seen as a one-hit wonder and refused the parody. Beck stated in 2022 that he wished he had given Yankovic permission, saying "I think it would have been an amazing video, I'm actually really sad it didn't happen." Although the parody was refused, "Loser" was used as the opening song in "The Alternative Polka" from Bad Hair Day.

Yankovic had planned to make a parody based on "Hedwig's Theme" from the Harry Potter film series, but had been refused by Warner Bros. Pictures. Yankovic said that perhaps if he did a parody based on a franchise, "it's usually better just to do it and ask for forgiveness rather than permission".

=== Live performances ===
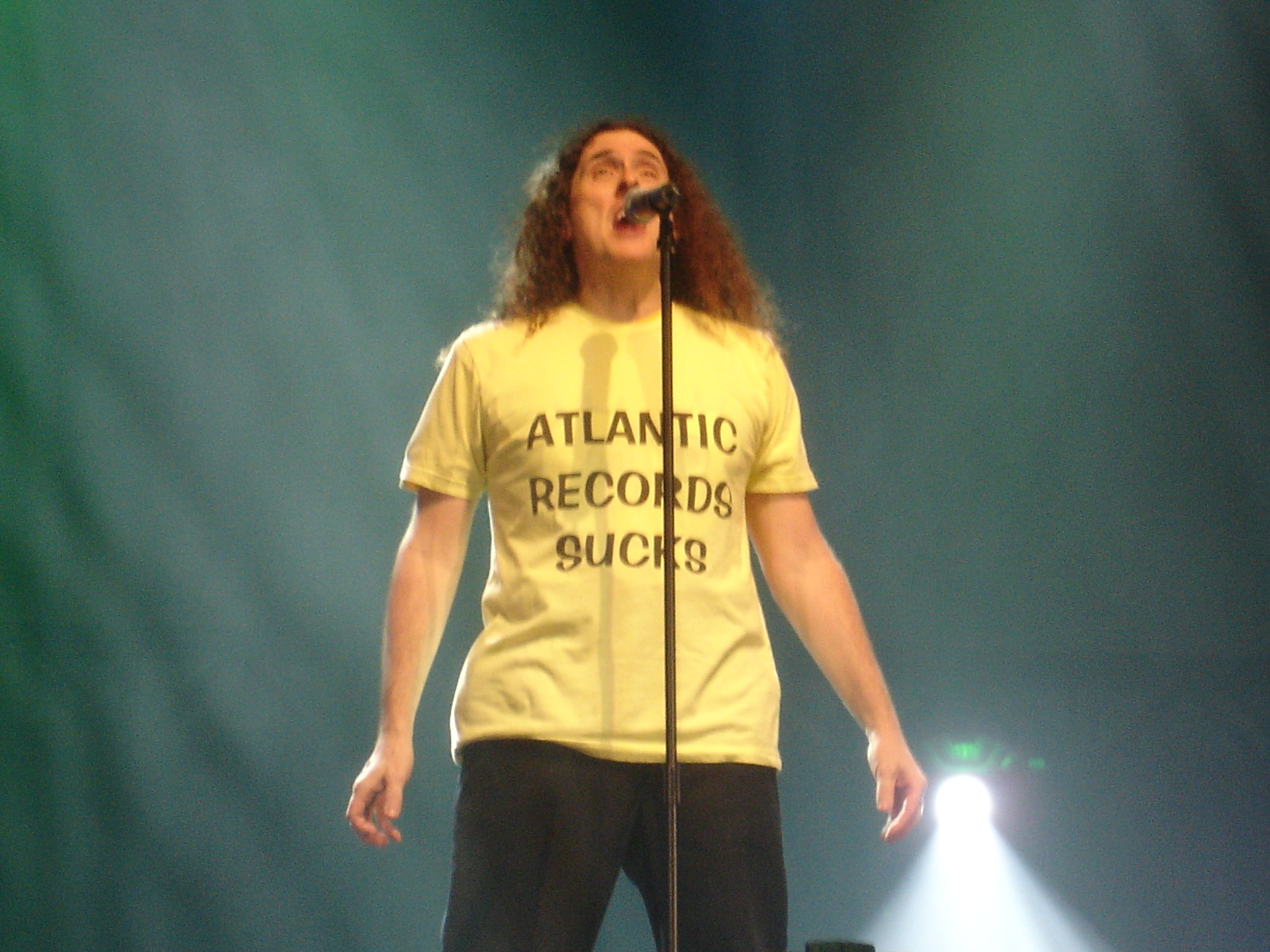
Weird Al wearing his "Atlantic Records Sucks" shirt during a performance of "You're Pitiful", in 2007, at the Ohio State Fair

Yankovic often describes his live concert performances as "a rock and comedy multimedia extravaganza" with an audience that "ranges from toddlers to geriatrics". Apart from Yankovic and his band performing his classic and contemporary hits, staples of Yankovic's live performances include a medley of parodies, many costume changes between songs, and a video screen on which various clips are played during the costume changes. A concert from Yankovic's 1999 tour, Touring with Scissors, for the Running with Scissors album was released on VHS in 1999 and on DVD in 2000. Titled "Weird Al" Yankovic Live!, the concert was recorded at the Marin County Civic Center in San Rafael, California, on October 2, 1999. For legal reasons, video clips (apart from those for Yankovic's own music videos) could not be shown for the home release, and unreleased parodies were removed from the parody medley for the performance.

In 2003, Yankovic toured overseas for the first time. Before 2003, Yankovic and his band had toured only the United States and parts of Canada. Following the success of Poodle Hat in Australia, Yankovic performed eleven shows in Australia's major capital cities and regional areas in October of that year. Yankovic returned to Australia and toured New Zealand for the first time in 2007 to support the Straight Outta Lynwood album. On September 8, 2007, Yankovic performed his 1,000th live show at Idaho Falls, Idaho.

Yankovic has invited members of the 501st Legion on stage during performances of his Star Wars-themed songs "Yoda" and "The Saga Begins", recruiting members of local garrisons (club chapters) while on tour. In appreciation, the 501st inducted Yankovic as a "Friend of the Legion" in September 2007.

He performed his first ever European mini-tour, including an appearance at the All Tomorrow's Parties music festival in Minehead, England in December 2010. Yankovic was picked to perform by the Canadian band Godspeed You! Black Emperor, who curated the festival's lineup. Yankovic played three other dates in the UK around his festival appearance before performing a single date in the Netherlands.

A second concert film, "Weird Al" Yankovic Live!: The Alpocalypse Tour, aired on Comedy Central on October 1, 2011, and was released on Blu-ray and DVD three days later. The concert was filmed at Massey Hall in Toronto, Canada, during Yankovic's tour supporting the album Alpocalypse. As before, video clips (apart from those for his own videos) and unreleased songs were edited out for legal reasons.

Yankovic performed George Harrison's "What Is Life" at the live-recorded George Fest (Los Angeles, 2014). DVD and Blu-Ray CD combos of the concert honoring Harrison became available in early 2016.

Following the release of Mandatory Fun, Yankovic toured across the United States, Canada, and selected overseas venues in the Mandatory World Tour from 2015 through 2016, principally featuring songs from this album. After taking a year off, Yankovic returned to tour in the United States and Canada from February to June 2018 in The Ridiculously Self-Indulgent, Ill-Advised Vanity Tour. On this tour, he performed mostly original songs (not parodies) and did not use costumes, props, or video screens. Comedian Emo Philips was the opening act. A further staple of this tour was Yankovic's cover performance of a different famous song at each venue, which Yankovic stated was something he and his band enjoyed doing.

Starting in June 2019, Yankovic went on his Strings Attached Tour, where he performed every show backed by a forty-one piece orchestra assembled from local musicians. The tour was inspired by a 2016 performance he did with the Hollywood Bowl Orchestra, which he considered a "religious experience" and sought to replicate on tour. The shows were generally much shorter, as under union rules Yankovic could only perform 90 minutes per show with an orchestra, requiring him to select songs that he felt would be ones that he had either long wanted to perform with an orchestra, such as the deep-cut "Harvey the Wonder Hamster" from Alapalooza, or that fit best with the orchestra backing. Yankovic had the shows open with the orchestra performing a few instrumental themes, seemingly giving the concert a high-brow quality, before he and his band entered and played his songs backed by the orchestra. The concerts finished with a large flashy production of his Star Wars songs, including "The Saga Begins" and "Yoda".

Yankovic toured again in 2022, following up from his 2018 tour with the Unfortunate Return Of The Ridiculously Self-Indulgent, Ill-Advised Vanity Tour, focusing on his lesser-known songs. The tour included 133 shows, concluding with Yankovic's first performance at Carnegie Hall in October 2022. Yankovic said "I've loved doing every single incarnation of my live show, but honestly the Vanity tour is the most fun I've ever had on stage, so I've been dying to get back out there and torture everybody with it once again!"

Yankovic toured in 2025 with the Bigger and Weirder Tour, with 65 different shows, including his first ever performance at Madison Square Garden.

=== Legacy and influence ===
With "Word Crimes" from Mandatory Fun debuting at No. 39 on the Billboard Hot 100 in 2014, Yankovic became the third musical artist after Michael Jackson and Madonna to have a song in the Top 40 of the Billboard Hot 100 over each decade since the 1980s, his other Top 40 songs being "Eat It", "Smells Like Nirvana", and "White & Nerdy". Since then, only U2 and Kenny G have also entered this group. Billboard named Yankovic No. 15 of the top 100 music video artists of all time in an August 2020 compilation, addressing that alongside his musical fame, "his accompanying video parodies are a vital part of the recipe".

With his four-decade career, Yankovic's work has also influenced newer artists. Andy Samberg of the group The Lonely Island considered Yankovic an influence during his childhood. Lin-Manuel Miranda directly credits Yankovic as an influence on his musical Hamilton. Television producer Michael Schur considered that Yankovic's music represented a "deep egalitarian spirit of our culture" that allowed his comedy writers to reflect on society within his shows.

While a large percentage of Yankovic's fanbase are from those that grew up with his music during the 1980s and 1990s, these fans have since become parents of their own and have shared their love of Yankovic's music with their children, and many of his more recent live tours in the 2020s are attended by both generations of fans, particularly fathers with their sons.

In 2017, a commemorative plaque was installed outside of the bathroom at California Polytechnic State University (Yankovic's alma mater) where he recorded the track "My Bologna". The plaque humorously refers to the bathroom, which is room 229 of Building 26, as "Studio 229".

On August 25, 2019, the town of Darwin, Minnesota permanently renamed the street beside the Largest ball of twine built by a single person "Weird Alley" in recognition of Yankovic, who was performing that week at the Minnesota State Fair. Yankovic had previously written about the ball of twine with the track "The Biggest Ball of Twine in Minnesota" from the soundtrack of the film UHF (1989). In response to the honor, Yankovic wrote on Twitter that "the Grammys and platinum albums are nice and all, but now I know I’ve finally made it: they just renamed the alley next to the Darwin, MN Twine Ball".

In 2020, Mark Riedl, a researcher at Georgia Tech, created an algorithm that generates lyrics to match the rhyme and syllable schemes of preexisting songs. The algorithm was called "Weird A.I. Yankovic" in reference to Yankovic's similar song parodies.

As of 7 September 2026, The International Astronomical Union designates minor planet 14331 as asteroid Alyankovic. The nomination comes from researchers Allison McGraw, Tim McCoy, Melissa Brucker and astrophysicist Steve Desch. Yankovic was nominated and honored on the basis of his outsized contributions to nerd culture and his science-related music. Alyankovic orbits the sun approximately once every 3.8 years and resides in the Asteroid Belt between Jupiter and Mars.

== Other works ==
=== Films ===
==== UHF ====
In 1989, Yankovic starred in a feature film called UHF, co-written by himself and manager Jay Levey and filmed in Tulsa, Oklahoma. A satire of the television and film industries, also starring Michael Richards, Fran Drescher, and Victoria Jackson, it brought floundering studio Orion their highest test scores since the film RoboCop. However, it was unsuccessful in theaters due to both poor critical reception and competition from other summer blockbusters at the time such as Indiana Jones and the Last Crusade, Lethal Weapon 2, Batman and Licence to Kill. The failure of the film left Yankovic in a three-year slump, which was later broken by his inspiration to compose "Smells Like Nirvana".

The film has since become a cult classic; fans bought it on eBay for high prices before it came out on DVD. Yankovic occasionally shows clips from the film at his concerts (to which MGM, the film's current owner, initially objected in the form of a cease and desist letter). In an apparent attempt to make it more accessible to overseas audiences, where the term UHF is used less frequently to describe TV broadcasts, the film was titled The Vidiot From UHF in Australia and parts of Europe.

UHF shows the creation of Yankovic's signature food—the Twinkie Wiener Sandwich. The snack consists of an overturned Twinkie split open as a makeshift bun, a hot dog, and Easy Cheese put together and dipped in milk before eating. Yankovic has stated that he has switched to using tofu hot dogs since becoming a vegetarian, but still enjoys the occasional Twinkie Wiener Sandwich.

==== Weird: The Al Yankovic Story ====
In 2010, Eric Appel produced a Funny or Die trailer for Weird: The Al Yankovic Story, a fictional biographical film that parodies other films based on musicians; Yankovic (played by Aaron Paul) is seen hiding his "weirdness" from his parents (Gary Cole and Mary Steenburgen), making it big using song parodies with the help of Dr. Demento (Patton Oswalt), falling in and out of love with Madonna (Olivia Wilde), and fading into alcoholism and being arrested, at which point his father finally admits he is "weird" as well. Yankovic himself plays a music producer in the short. Yankovic and Appel announced in January 2022 that they would be making a full-length biopic of the same name based on the trailer, starring Daniel Radcliffe as Yankovic, Evan Rachel Wood as Madonna, and Rainn Wilson as Dr. Demento. The film premiered at the Toronto International Film Festival in September 2022, and was released on the Roku Channel in November 2022. The film's soundtrack album includes several re-recorded parodies featured in the film along with an original song "Now You Know". Among other nominations and awards, the film won the Best Television Movie at the 75th Primetime Creative Arts Emmy Awards.

=== Television ===
In 2012, Yankovic extensively featured in the sixth-season episode of 30 Rock, "Kidnapped by Danger", in which Jenna Maroney desperately tries to come up with a "'Weird Al'-proof" song. In 2014, he performed at the 66th Primetime Emmy Awards, singing a comedic medley of songs based on the themes of several Emmy-nominated shows, including Mad Men and Game of Thrones. Yankovic and Miranda appeared on the July 21, 2025, episode of The Late Show with Stephen Colbert a few days after news that the program would be cancelled, showing support for Colbert along with a number of guest cameos from other late night talk show hosts.

==== Al TV ====
Following the success of "Eat It" and its subsequent music video in 1984, Yankovic was the host and writer of specials on MTV and VH1 directed by Jay Levey and Robert K. Weiss known as Al TV. These specials were usually 1–4 hours in runtime, and consisted of sketches and other comedic gags throughout the show. The gags mainly consisting of commercials for imaginary products, fake celebrity interviews (edited to appear as if Yankovic is really interviewing said celebrity), and letters from fans, along with various other non sequiturs. 10 specials were aired, with the first 8 airing on MTV and the last two airing on VH1 in 2006. A special similar in premise titled Al Music was broadcast in Canadian audiences on the MuchMusic channel.

=== Animation and voice work ===
Yankovic has done voice-overs for several animated series. He appeared in a 2003 episode of The Simpsons, singing "The Ballad of Homer & Marge" (a parody of John Mellencamp's "Jack & Diane") with his band. The episode, "Three Gays of the Condo", in which Marge hires Yankovic to sing the aforementioned song to Homer in an attempt to reconcile their marriage, later won an Emmy Award for "Outstanding Animated Program (For Programming Less Than One Hour)". Yankovic also had cameos in a 2008 episode, titled "That '90s Show", during which he records a parody of Homer's grunge hit "Shave Me" titled "Brain Freeze" (Homer's song, "Shave Me", was itself a parody of Nirvana's "Rape Me"), and in the couch gag of a 2023 episode, titled "Hostile Kirk Place", making Yankovic one of only a handful of celebrities to appear three times on the show playing themselves.

He appeared in the animated Adult Swim show Robot Chicken as himself, which provided him with a music video for the song "Weasel Stomping Day". Yankovic is the voice for Squid Hat on the Cartoon Network show The Grim Adventures of Billy & Mandy. He is also the announcer of the cartoon's eponymous video game adaptation.

Yankovic had a guest appearance voicing Wreck-Gar, a waste collection vehicle Transformer in the Transformers: Animated cartoon series; previously, Yankovic's "Dare to Be Stupid" song was featured in the 1986 animated film The Transformers: The Movie, during the sequence in which Wreck-Gar was first introduced; as such, the song is referenced in the episode. He also plays local TV talent show host Uncle Muscles on several episodes of Tim and Eric Awesome Show, Great Job! along with other appearances on the show. Yankovic has also supplied the voice of one-shot character 'Petroleum Joe' on The Brak Show. He also voiced himself on a Back at the Barnyard episode, and he appeared as a ringmaster who helps the regular characters of Yo Gabba Gabba! organize a circus in a 2007 episode of the children's show.

In 2011, Yankovic appeared as himself in the Batman: The Brave and the Bold episode "Bat-Mite Presents: Batman's Strangest Cases!" In 2012, he appeared on two episodes of The Aquabats! Super Show!, playing two different characters as the superhero SuperMagic PowerMan and as the president of the United States. In 2014, he appeared in the fourth season of My Little Pony: Friendship Is Magic episode "Pinkie Pride" as Cheese Sandwich, a rival party planner to Pinkie Pie. He later reprised the role in the season 9 episode "The Last Laugh".

In 2015, Yankovic voiced the supervillain Darkseid in the Teen Titans Go! episode "Two Parter". He initially speaks with a deep, intimidating voice due to having a cold; after taking a lozenge, he speaks in his normal voice, and the heroes are no longer afraid of him. Cyborg points out that Darkseid sounds like Yankovic, and the villain replies that he was "a true monster" for "undercutting musicians by subverting their words and compromising their artistic integrity". Cyborg objects to this, and they battle.

In 2016, Yankovic appeared in two episodes of BoJack Horseman as Mr. Peanutbutter's brother, Captain Peanutbutter, and began portraying Milo Murphy in the Disney XD series Milo Murphy's Law. Yankovic guest voiced as Papa Kotassium in a 2016 episode of Cartoon Network's animated series, Mighty Magiswords, which was created by Weird Al fan, musician and accordionist Kyle Carrozza. Carrozza sent a FAQ to Weird Al when Carrozza was in college in 1999.

=== Web media ===
In 2008, Weird Al joined Michael J. Nelson as a guest on the RiffTrax audio commentary of Jurassic Park. On November 10, 2009, Weird Al was a guest "internet scientist" on Rocketboom's "Know Your Meme" video series, in the installment on the topic of Auto-Tune, hosted by Jamie Wilkinson. Yankovic later appeared in another Funny or Die short alongside Huey Lewis which parodied the ax murder scene in the film American Psycho, in which Christian Bale's character Patrick Bateman discusses the nature of Lewis's musical work before killing his victim.

Yankovic performed with his core band for NPR's Tiny Desk Concerts in June 2010, and again with a larger backing band in August 2026.

For The Nerdist Podcast, Weird Al began hosting a new comedic celebrity interview web series, Face to Face with "Weird Al"Yankovic, on April 3, 2012. The series features Al TV-esque fake interviews with film stars. Al has appeared on numerous other webshows, including CollegeHumor, LearningTown, Some Jerk with a Camera, Team Unicorn, and Epic Rap Battles of History appearing as Sir Isaac Newton in a battle against actors portraying Bill Nye, the Science Guy (YouTube star Nice Peter), and Neil deGrasse Tyson (Chali 2na of the group Jurassic 5).

Yankovic has collaborated with the Gregory Brothers on music videos satirizing American presidential election debates. The first music video was released in October 2016, titled "Bad Hombres, Nasty Women", shortly after the third debate between Donald Trump and Hillary Clinton, with Yankovic singing between autotuned snippets from the candidates. Yankovic collaborated with the Gregory Brothers on a similar video, titled "We're All Doomed" after the first debate in the 2020 campaign between Trump and Joe Biden. In 2024, Yankovic and the Gregory Brothers released "Deja Vu (But Worse)" about the presidential debate in June 2024 between Trump and then-candidate Joe Biden.

In 2018, Yankovic performed the theme song for the Dropout animated web series Cartoon Hell.

=== Directing ===
Yankovic has directed many of his own music videos; he has directed all of his music videos from 1993's "Bedrock Anthem" to 2006's "White & Nerdy". He also directed the end sequence of 1986's "Christmas at Ground Zero" (an original piece juxtaposing Christmas with nuclear warfare) from his Polka Party! album and the title sequence to Spy Hard, for which he sang the title song.

Yankovic wrote, directed and starred in the short 3-D film attraction "Al's Brain: A 3-D Journey Through The Human Brain", a $2.5 million project which was sponsored by and premiered at the Orange County Fair in Costa Mesa, California, in 2009. The project included a brief cameo by Sir Paul McCartney, which Yankovic directed during McCartney's appearance at the 2009 Coachella Valley Music and Arts Festival. Fair CEO Steve Beazley, who supported the project, considered the project a success and explored leasing the exhibit to other fairs; the second appearance of the exhibit was at the 2009 Puyallup Fair in Washington.

He has also directed several videos for other artists, including Hanson (the Titanic sequences in "River"), The Black Crowes ("Only a Fool"), Ben Folds ("Rockin' the Suburbs"), Jeff Foxworthy ("Redneck Stomp" and "Party All Night"), Jon Spencer Blues Explosion ("Wail"), and the Presidents of the United States of America ("Mixed Up S.O.B"). He has cameo appearances in his videos for Jon Spencer Blues Explosion, Hanson (as the interviewer), and Ben Folds (as the producer fixing Folds' "shitty tracks").

On January 25, 2010, Yankovic announced that he had signed a production deal with Warner Bros. to write and direct a live-action feature film for Cartoon Network. Although Yankovic previously wrote the script for UHF, this was to be the first film he directed. Yankovic stated that he would not be starring in the film, as Cartoon Network wanted a younger protagonist. During an interview on Comedy Death-Ray Radio, Yankovic revealed that though Cartoon Network "loved" his script, the network decided that they were no longer intending to produce feature films. Yankovic initially stated that he would instead shop the script around to other potential studios, but in 2013 revealed that the project had been scrapped as "it was really geared for Cartoon Network" and that he had "cannibalized jokes from that script to use for other projects".

=== Books ===
Yankovic wrote When I Grow Up, a children's book released on February 1, 2011, and published by HarperCollins. The book features 8-year-old Billy presenting to his class the wide variety of imaginative career possibilities that he is considering. Yankovic stated that the idea for the book was based on his own "circuitous" career path. The book allows Yankovic to apply the humorous writing style found in his music in another medium, allowing him to use puns and rhymes. Yankovic worked with HarperCollins' editor Anne Hoppe—the first time that Yankovic has had an editor—and found her help to be a positive experience. The book is illustrated by Wes Hargis, who, according to Yankovic, has "a childlike quality and a very fun quality and a very imaginative quality" that matched well with Yankovic's writing. The book reached the No. 4 position on The New York Times Best Seller list for Children's Picture Books for the week of February 20, 2011.

Yankovic also wrote a sequel to When I Grow Up, 2013's My New Teacher and Me!.

Yankovic became the first guest editor for Mad magazine for their 533rd issue, published in April 2015.

Yankovic partnered with Z2 Comics to produce The Illustrated Al: The Songs of "Weird Al" Yankovic, which was released on January 19, 2023. The book takes twenty of Yankovic's songs and illustrates them in comic form, each by different artists. Yankovic selected artists for the book based on past experience in working with the artists, but short of proofing the final work, was otherwise hands-off for various editorial choices. Following publication of The Illustrated Al, Yankovic started working with the illustrators to produce new videos for these older songs, the first which was released in January 2023.

=== Stage musical ===
Dare to Be Stupid: The Weird Al Musical was announced in development in May 2026. Alex Timbers is set to direct with Yankovic, Scott Brown and Anthony King writing the musical. The musical will feature works from throughout Yankovic's musical catalog. As of October 2026, Yankovic said that while they were practicing the musical, they were waiting for music rights to be cleared before pushing forward with it.

=== Other media ===
Yankovic competed on a week of Wheel of Fortune taped at Disney's Hollywood Studios in March 1994. He also competed on Rock & Roll Jeopardy!

Yankovic joined the band Hanson in their music video for "Thinking 'bout Somethin'" in which he plays the tambourine.

Yankovic contributed backing vocals for the song "Time" on Ben Folds' album Songs for Silverman.

Yankovic was also one of many celebrities who took part in the NOH8 Campaign against Proposition 8, which banned same-sex marriage in California.

Yankovic was approached by a beer company to endorse their product. Yankovic had turned it down because he believed that "a lot of my fans were young and impressionable". Yankovic later posted on his Twitter account that he never regretted the decision.

In 2009, Yankovic was a special guest on an episode of G4's Web Soup where he came as Mark Gormley at first.

In 2011, Yankovic guest starred as the character "Banana Man" in an episode of Adventure Time. The same year, he appeared as himself in the How I Met Your Mother episode "Noretta".

In 2012, he appeared as himself along with Alice Cooper, Bret Michaels, and Maria Menounos in The High Fructose Adventures of Annoying Orange for the Christmas special, and sung with Alice, Bret, and Orange.

On May 31, 2014, Yankovic won the ACE Award (Amateur Cartoonist Extraordinaire) from the National Cartoonists Society at its awards banquet in San Diego.

From 2014 until 2017, Yankovic appeared as a celebrity contestant in eight episodes of the game show Celebrity Name Game.

On November 19, 2014, a RadioShack ad was uploaded to YouTube which featured Al in the role of a RadioShack employee.

In 2015, Yankovic made an appearance on an episode of The Odd Couple as a yoga student in the class Felix takes over for one day.

Also in 2015, Yankovic was featured as Mad magazine's first ever guest editor for their 533rd issue.

In 2016, Yankovic became the bandleader on the IFC series Comedy Bang! Bang!, on which he had previously guest starred.

In the official video for Weezer's cover of "Africa" published in September 2018, which itself is parody of Weezer's video for "Undone – The Sweater Song", Yankovic stands in for Rivers Cuomo as vocalist and lead guitar.

Though he does not appear, Yankovic is mentioned directly by name in the 2021 television series Y: The Last Man adapted from the 2000s comic book series of the same name, which involves a post-apocalyptic alternative timeline where all the men of the world had died. Whereas the comic book had the characters reflect on the absence of the Rolling Stones, showrunner Eliza Clark opted to update the references for the show, and used Yankovic as a more modern artist that had been considered a great loss.

In 2025, Yankovic appeared in the music video for "Terrapin" by American indie musician Clairo, in which he plays Clairo. The music video was directed by American actress Ayo Edebiri, marking Yankovic's first collaboration with either of them.

With the growth of generative AI in the 2020s, abbreviated as "AI", the "Weird Al" name has often been juxtaposed with the phrase "weird AI", which in many fonts look visually similar. Yankovic rejected an offer to appear in advertisements for a company selling business products that used artificial intelligence; while he had initially accepted the offer, on learning that the products used artificial intelligence, he backed out, saying "Oh no, I can't be the poster boy for AI, forget it."

== Misattribution and imitators ==
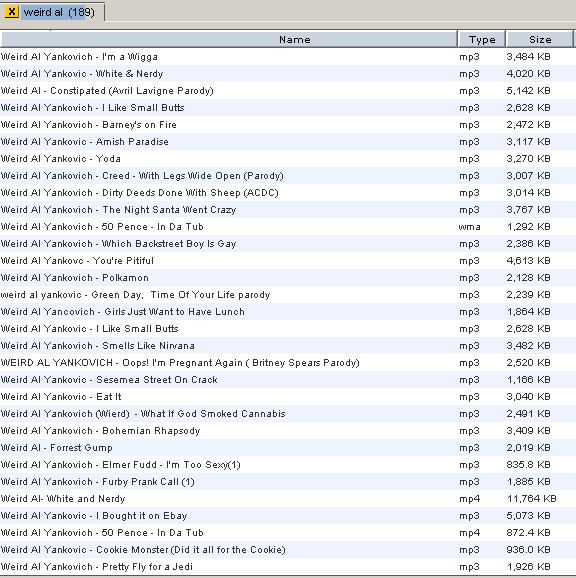
A screenshot of LimeWire PRO, showing a large number of parodies misattributed to Yankovic, as well as numerous misspellings of his surname (February 2007)

Songs posted to file-sharing networks are often misattributed to him because of their humorous subject matter. Often, his surname is misspelled (and thus mispronounced) as "Yankovich", among other variations. Much to the disdain of Yankovic, these misattributed files include songs that are racist, sexually explicit, or otherwise offensive. A young listener who had heard several of these offensive tracks by way of a file-sharing service confronted Yankovic online, threatening a boycott because of his supposedly explicit lyrics. Quite a few of the songs, such as "Star Wars Cantina" by Mark Jonathan Davis (not, in a double misattribution, his lounge-singer character Richard Cheese), "Star Wars Gangsta Rap", "Yoda Smokes Weed", "Chewbacca", "The Devil Went to Jamaica", and several more have a Star Wars motif. Some songs misattributed to him are not songs, but spoken skits, such as "Sesame Street on Crack", which is also widely misattributed to Adam Sandler. A list of songs frequently misattributed to Yankovic can be found at The Not Al Page and a list of all commercially released songs recorded by Yankovic can be found on his website.

Yankovic cites these misattributions as his only real problem with peer-to-peer file-sharing sites:

If you do a search for my name on any one of those sites, I guarantee you that about half of the songs that come up will be songs I had absolutely nothing to do with. That particularly bothers me, because I really try to do quality work, and I also try to maintain a more-or-less family-friendly image—and some of these songs that are supposedly by me are just, well, vulgar and awful. I truly think my reputation has suffered in a lot of people's minds because of all those fake Weird Al songs floating around the Internet.

In terms of legitimate parodies of Yankovic, the Mr. Show sketch "Superstar Machine" features Bob Odenkirk as the character Daffy "Mal" Yinkleyankle. Yankovic was impressed by the parody, and stated that it "zeroed in on everything that's irritating about me".

== Fan-driven campaigns ==
The Weird Al Star Fund was a campaign started by Yankovic's fans to get him a star on the Hollywood Walk of Fame. Their mission was to "solicit, collect, and raise the necessary money, and to compile the information needed for the application to nominate 'Weird Al' Yankovic for a star on the Hollywood Walk of Fame". Fans worldwide have sent donations to raise the US$40,000 needed for a nomination. In addition to the preferred method of cash donations, many methods were used to raise money for the cause, such as a live benefit show held April 11, 2006, and selling merchandise on the official website and eBay, including T-shirts, calendars, and cookbooks. On May 26, 2006, the campaign hit the then-$15,000 target, just five days before the May 31 deadline to submit the necessary paperwork. However, Yankovic was not included on the list of inductees for 2007. On February 9, 2007, the Hollywood Chamber Of Commerce raised the price to sponsor a new star to $25,000. Yankovic's application was resubmitted for consideration in 2007, but he was not included among 2008's inductees. In December 2010, the price was raised again to $30,000, and in 2017 the price was raised to $40,000. The campaign raised the new target each time and applications continued to be submitted yearly, until The Hollywood Chamber of Commerce announced in June 2017 that Yankovic would receive a star on the Walk of Fame as one of the 2018 inductees. In an official induction ceremony on August 27, 2018, Al received the 2,643rd star on the Hollywood Walk of Fame. The star is located at 6914 Hollywood Blvd, directly across the street from TCL Chinese Theatre. The ceremony was attended by 1,500 fans.

Similar to the Weird Al Star Fund, a second fan-driven campaign called "Make the Rock Hall 'Weird'" has tried to enshrine him into the Rock and Roll Hall of Fame in Cleveland, Ohio, for which he has been eligible since 2004. Previous attempts to raise awareness for the campaign and support Yankovic's nomination included a petition drive from 2006 to 2007, which raised over 9000 signatures; an art competition in 2005; additionally, a documentary film about the campaign is currently being developed. In addition to these efforts, an ongoing campaign is underway in which supporters of Yankovic's nomination are requested to send "sincere, thoughtful" letters to the Rock Hall Foundation's headquarters in New York. The Hall has not considered Yankovic for nomination since the campaign started in 2004. A 2009 Rolling Stone poll named Weird Al as the top artist that should be nominated for the Hall of Fame, followed by Rush (who were inducted in 2013) and The Moody Blues (inducted in 2018) in the top ten. According to the museum's chairperson John Sykes, while Yankovic has come up in various discussions on nominees, "he's never made it close to the ballot" due to the artists that vote towards the inductees. Yankovic himself has stated that he is indifferent to being inducted.

A smaller ongoing effort has been made by fans to have Yankovic perform at the halftime show of a Super Bowl game. This inspired Yankovic to write the fight song parody "Sports Song" for Mandatory Fun to help round out his repertoire. Subsequent to the success of Mandatory Fun, another fan-driven campaign pushed for Yankovic to headline the then-upcoming Super Bowl XLIX at the highlight of the artist's career, which was noticed by many media outlets, including CNN and Wired, though the decision for this selection would reside within the management of the NFL (who instead chose Katy Perry for that position). Yankovic believed that he would never be selected as a standalone act for the Super Bowl, but could see other bands include him as a special guest if they were selected.

== Awards ==
"Weird Al" Yankovic awards and nominations
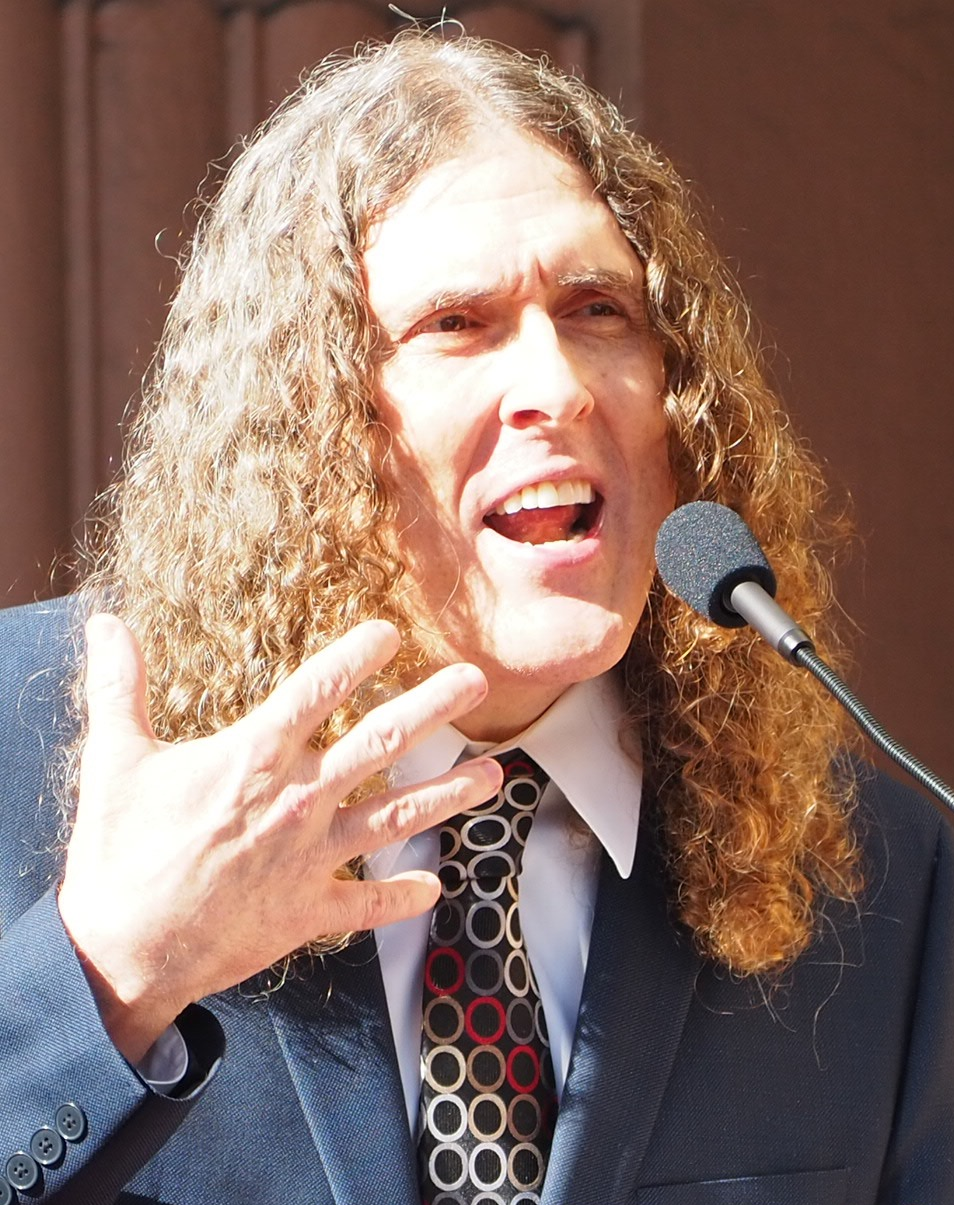
Awards and nominations
| Award | Wins | Nominations |
| Grammy | 5 | 17 |

Totals (Note: Certain award groups do not simply award one winner. They acknowledge several different recipients, have runners-up, and have third place. Since this is a specific recognition and is different from losing an award, runner-up mentions are considered wins in this award tally. For simplification and to avoid errors, each award in this list has been presumed to have had a prior nomination.)
- Wins: 5
- Nominations: 16

=== Grammy Awards ===
| Year | Category | Work | Result | Ref. |
|---|---|---|---|---|
| 1984 | Best Comedy Recording | "Eat It" | Won | |
| 1985 | Best Comedy Recording | Dare to Be Stupid | Nominated | |
| 1987 | Best Comedy Recording | Polka Party! | Nominated | |
| 1988 | Best Concept Music Video | "Fat" | Won | |
| 1988 | Best Recording for Children | Peter & the Wolf/Carnival of the Animals – Part II | Nominated | |
| 1988 | Best Comedy Recording | Even Worse | Nominated | |
| 1992 | Best Comedy Recording | Off the Deep End | Nominated | |
| 1994 | Best Short Form Music Video | "Jurassic Park" | Nominated | |
| 2003 | Best Comedy Album | Poodle Hat | Won | |
| 2006 | Best Comedy Album | Straight Outta Lynwood | Nominated | |
| 2006 | Best Surround Sound Album | Straight Outta Lynwood | Nominated | |
| 2009 | Best Comedy Album | Internet Leaks | Nominated | |
| 2011 | Best Short Form Music Video | "Perform This Way" | Nominated | |
| 2011 | Best Comedy Album | Alpocalypse | Nominated | |
| 2014 | Best Comedy Album | Mandatory Fun | Won | |
| 2018 | Best Boxed or Special Limited Edition Package | Squeeze Box: The Complete Works of "Weird Al" Yankovic | Won | |
| 2023 | Best Compilation Soundtrack for Visual Media | Weird: The Al Yankovic Story | Nominated | |

=== Hollywood Critics Association TV Awards ===
| Year | Category | Work | Result | Ref. |
|---|---|---|---|---|
| 2023 | Best Writing in a Streaming Limited or Anthology Series or Movie | Weird: The Al Yankovic Story | Won | |
| 2023 | Best Original Song | "Now You Know" | Nominated | |

=== Hollywood Music in Media Awards ===
| Year | Category | Work | Result | Ref. |
|---|---|---|---|---|
| 2017 | Best Original Song – Animated Film | "Captain Underpants Theme Song" | Nominated | |
| 2022 | Best Original Song – Streamed Film (No Theatrical Release) | "Now You Know" | Won | |
| 2022 | Music Themed Film, Biopic or Musical | Weird: The Al Yankovic Story | Nominated | |

=== Online Film and Television Association Awards ===
| Year | Category | Work | Result | Ref. |
|---|---|---|---|---|
| 2019 | Best Guest Actor in a Comedy Series | Crazy Ex-Girlfriend | Nominated | |

=== Primetime Emmy Awards ===
| Year | Category | Work | Result | Ref. |
|---|---|---|---|---|
| 2023 | Outstanding Writing for a Limited or Anthology Series or Movie | Weird: The Al Yankovic Story | Nominated | |
| 2023 | Outstanding Television Movie | Weird: The Al Yankovic Story | Won | |
| 2023 | Outstanding Original Music and Lyrics | "Now You Know" | Nominated | |

=== Producers Guild of America Awards ===
| Year | Category | Work | Result | Ref. |
|---|---|---|---|---|
| 2022 | Outstanding Producer of Streamed or Televised Motion Pictures | Weird: The Al Yankovic Story | Won | |

=== Society of Composers and Lyricists Awards ===
| Year | Category | Work | Result | Ref. |
|---|---|---|---|---|
| 2022 | Outstanding Original Song for a Comedy or Musical Visual Media Production | "Now You Know" | Nominated | |

=== Streamy Awards ===
| Year | Category | Work | Result | Ref. |
|---|---|---|---|---|
| 2010 | Best Guest Star in a Web Series | Know Your Meme | Won | |

=== Writers Guild of America Awards ===
| Year | Category | Work | Result | Ref. |
|---|---|---|---|---|
| 2022 | TV & New Media Motion Pictures | Weird: The Al Yankovic Story | Nominated | |

== Band members ==
Yankovic's core band, consisting of Jon "Bermuda" Schwartz, Jim West, and Steve Jay, have performed with him for more than 40 years, and grew with the addition of Rubén Valtierra. Yankovic credits this group as having the flexibility to play any musical genre, allowing him to perform songs across a wide range of musical styles, in addition to "we're kind of telepathic in the way we communicate now, so we're a lot better than we were back in the day". With his 2025 Bigger & Weirder Tour, Yankovic added four additional members, Probyn Gregory, Scheila Gonzalez, Payton Velligan, and Monique Donnelly, all together that add a range of additional instruments that Yankovic can incorporate, in addition for three-part female vocal harmony with Gonzalez, Velligan, and Donnelly.

Current members

- "Weird Al" Yankovic – lead vocals, accordion, keyboards, occasional live percussion (1976–present)
- Jon "Bermuda" Schwartz – drums, percussion, backing vocals (1980–present)
- Jim "Kimo" West – guitar, mandolin, backing vocals, occasional banjo (1983–present)
- Steve Jay – bass, banjo, backing vocals, occasional live keyboards (1983–present)
- Rubén Valtierra – piano, keyboards, backing vocals, occasional live percussion (1991–present)

Touring members

- Probyn Gregory – backing vocals, trumpet, trombone, tuba, guitars, percussion (2025–present)
- Scheila Gonzalez – backing vocals, saxophone, clarinet, percussion (2025–present)
- Payton Velligan – backing vocals, guitars, percussion (2025–present)
- Monique Donnelly – backing vocals, keyboards, percussion (2025–present)

Former members

- Rick Derringer – guitar, occasional mandolin, backing vocals (1982–1990; died 2025)

Timeline

== Discography ==
Studio albums

- "Weird Al" Yankovic (1983)
- "Weird Al" Yankovic in 3-D (1984)
- Dare to Be Stupid (1985)
- Polka Party! (1986)
- Even Worse (1988)
- UHF – Original Motion Picture Soundtrack and Other Stuff (1989)
- Off the Deep End (1992)
- Alapalooza (1993)
- Bad Hair Day (1996)
- Running with Scissors (1999)
- Poodle Hat (2003)
- Straight Outta Lynwood (2006)
- Alpocalypse (2011)
- Mandatory Fun (2014)

== Tours ==
- An Evening of Dementia with Dr. Demento in Person Plus "Weird Al" Yankovic (1983)
- Tour of the Universe in 3-D (1984)
- The Stupid Tour (1985)
- The Off the Deep End Tour (1992)
- The Alapalooza Tour (1994)
- The Al-Can Tour (1995)
- The Bad Hair Tour (1996–1997)
- Touring with Scissors (1999–2000)
- The Poodle Hat Tour (2003–2004)
- The Straight Outta Lynwood Tour (2007–2008)
- The Internet Leaks Tour (2010–2011)
- The Alpocalypse Tour (2011–2013)
- The Mandatory World Tour (2015–2016)
- The Ridiculously Self-Indulgent, Ill-Advised Vanity Tour (2018)
- Strings Attached Tour (2019)
- The Unfortunate Return of the Ridiculously Self-Indulgent, Ill-Advised Vanity Tour (2022–2023)
- Bigger & Weirder (2025–2026)

== Filmography ==
=== Film ===
| Year | Title | Role | Notes |
|---|---|---|---|
| 1988 | Tapeheads | Himself | |
| 1988 | The Naked Gun: From the Files of Police Squad! | Himself | |
| 1989 | UHF | George Newman | Also screenwriter |
| 1991 | The Naked Gun 2 1/2: The Smell of Fear | Police Station Thug | |
| 1994 | Naked Gun 33 1/3: The Final Insult | Himself | |
| 1996 | Spy Hard | Himself | Also composed the film's opening credits song |
| 1997 | Safety Patrol | Himself | |
| 1998 | Desperation Boulevard | Himself | |
| 2000 | Nothing Sacred | Clothing Store Customer | |
| 2003 | Haunted Lighthouse | Waiter | |
| 2009 | Halloween II | Himself | |
| 2009 | Al's Brain | Himself / Phineaus Cage | Short film |
| 2014 | The Moving Picture Co. 1914 | Jesus Christ | Short film |
| 2015 | Uncle Kent 2 | Himself | |
| 2015 | Batman vs. Robin | Anton Schott/Dollmaker | Voice |
| 2016 | Popstar: Never Stop Never Stopping | Hammerleg Lead Singer | |
| 2017 | Sandy Wexler | Himself | |
| 2017 | A Witches' Ball | Jax | |
| 2017 | How to Be a Latin Lover | Himself | |
| 2019 | Teen Titans Go! vs. Teen Titans | Jim Craddock/Gentleman Ghost, Darkseid | Voice |
| 2020 | Bill & Ted Face the Music | Himself | Cameo |
| 2020 | Phineas and Ferb the Movie: Candace Against the Universe | Shirt Cannon Guy | Voice |
| 2020 | Tiny Tim: King for a Day | Narrator | |
| 2022 | Weird: The Al Yankovic Story | Tony Scotti | Also co-writer and producer |
| 2022 | The Soccer Football Movie | Himself | Voice |
| 2025 | The Naked Gun | Himself | |
| 2025 | When We Went Mad | Himself | |
| 2026 | Gail Daughtry and the Celebrity Sex Pass | Himself | |

=== Television ===
List of live-action appearances on television
| Year | Title | Role | Notes |
|---|---|---|---|
| 1984 | Welcome to the Fun Zone | Himself | Television special |
| 1984 | Saturday Morning Preview Park | Himself | Television special |
| 1987 | Amazing Stories | The Cabbage Man | Episode: "Miss Stardust" |
| 1988 | Hey Hey It's Saturday | Himself | Episode: "17.23" |
| 1989 | D.C. Follies | Himself | Episode: "Dolly Parton Gives Makeup Tips to Barbara Bush" |
| 1989 | Just Say Julie | Himself | Episode: "Pilot" |
| 1990 | Seriously...Phil Collins | Executive | Television film |
| 1991 | Parker Lewis Can't Lose | Himself | Episode: "The Human Grace" |
| 1991–1992 | Square One Television | Himself / Murray the Mouth | 3 episodes |
| 1993 | Living and Working in Space: The Countdown Has Begun | Giles Standish | Television special |
| 1994–1997 | Space Ghost Coast to Coast | Himself | 2 episodes |
| 1995–1998 | The Eddie Files | Waiter / Man Interrogated /Bones McDuff | 3 episodes |
| 1997 | Oddville, MTV | Himself | Episode: "160" |
| 1997 | The Weird Al Show | Himself / Various | 13 episodes |
| 1998 | The Drew Carey Show | Himself | Episode: "Drew Between the Rock and a Hard Place" |
| 1999 | Mad TV | Himself | Episode: "5.1" |
| 2001 | V.I.P. | Himself | Episode: "Val's Big Bang" |
| 2007–2010 | Tim and Eric Awesome Show, Great Job! | Simon / Uncle Muscles | 7 episodes |
| 2010 | Yo Gabba Gabba! | Ringmaster | Episode: "Circus" |
| 2010 | Funny or Die Presents | Himself | Episode: "1.12" |
| 2011 | How I Met Your Mother | Himself | Episode: "Noretta" |
| 2012 | 30 Rock | Himself | Episode: "Kidnapped by Danger" |
| 2012 | The Aquabats! Super Show! | President Stuncastin / Super Magic Power Man! | 2 episodes |
| 2012–2016 | Comedy Bang! Bang! | Himself / Mike Cankers | 25 episodes Guest star (season 1–4); bandleader/co-host (season 5) |
| 2013–2015 | Childrens Hospital | Young Michael / Himself | 2 episodes |
| 2014 | Good Morning Today | Sir Alfred Yankovic | Episode: "1.9" |
| 2014 | @midnight | Himself | 5 episodes |
| 2014 | Garfunkel and Oates | Himself | Episode: "Third Member" |
| 2014–2015 | The Hotwives | Coach Cliff Bonadenturo / Bill | 3 episodes |
| 2014–2018 | Drunk History | Adolf Hitler / Adolf Eichmann | 2 episodes |
| 2015 | Impress Me | Himself | 2 episodes |
| 2015 | The Odd Couple | Steve | Episode: "Enlightening Strikes" |
| 2015 | Wet Hot American Summer: First Day of Camp | Jackie Brazen | 2 episodes |
| 2015 | Gaming Show (In My Parents' Garage) | Himself | Episode: "The Power Up 1000" |
| 2015–2016 | Galavant | Confessional Monk | 2 episodes |
| 2016 | The Goldbergs | Himself | Episode: "Weird Al" |
| 2016 | Ask the StoryBots | Spud Spa Yogi | Episode: "Where Do French Fries Come From?" |
| 2016 | Bajillion Dollar Propertie$ | Tug Friendly | Episode: "Amir vs Dean" |
| 2016–2017 | Last Week Tonight with John Oliver | Himself | 2 episodes |
| 2017 | My Brother, My Brother and Me | Himself | Episode: "Candlenights & Vape Ape" |
| 2017 | Tim and Eric Awesome Show Great Job! Awesome 10 Year Anniversary Version, Great Job? | Uncle Muscles | Television special |
| 2017 | Lady Dynamite | Himself | Episode: "Little Manila" |
| 2018 | Carpool Karaoke: The Series | Himself | Episode: "'Weird Al' Yankovic & The Lonely Island" |
| 2019 | Adam Ruins Everything | Shop Owner / The Devil | Episode: "Adam Ruins Games" |
| 2019 | Kevin Hart's Guide to Black History | Himself | Television special |
| 2019 | Crazy Ex-Girlfriend | Bernie | Episode: "I Have a Date Tonight" |
| 2019–2021 | Work in Progress | Himself | 2 episodes |
| 2020 | The Eric Andre Show | Himself | Episode: "Lizzo Up" |
| 2020 | Aunty Donna's Big Ol' House of Fun | Himself / Lindsay | 2 episodes |
| 2020–2022 | Reno 911! | Ted Nugent | 2 episodes |
| 2021 | Scooby-Doo, Where Are You Now! | Himself | Television special |
| 2023 | The Muppets Mayhem | Himself | Episode: "Track 5: Break On Through" |
| 2026 | Stuart Fails to Save the Universe | Himself | Episode: "Stuart Makes a Wallet" |

List of voice performances on television
| Year | Title | Role | Notes |
|---|---|---|---|
| 1997 | Eek! The Cat | Himself | Episode: "The FugEektive" |
| 1999 | Sabrina: The Animated Series | Himself | 3 episodes |
| 2002 | The Brak Show | Petroleum Joe | Episode: "Feud" |
| 2003, 2008, 2023 | The Simpsons | Himself | 3 episodes |
| 2003 | Lilo & Stitch: The Series | Singing Minstrel | Episode: "Tank: Experiment 586" |
| 2003–2005 | The Grim Adventures of Billy & Mandy | The Squid Hat | 3 episodes |
| 2004 | Johnny Bravo | Himself | Episode: "Johnny Makeover" |
| 2006 | Robot Chicken | Himself / Kevin | Episode: "The Munnery" |
| 2008–2009 | Transformers Animated | Wreck-Gar / Technician | 2 episodes |
| 2010 | Back at the Barnyard | Himself | Episode: "Get Bessy/A Beautiful Freddy" |
| 2010 | Yo Gabba Gabba! | The Ringmaster | Episode: "Circus" |
| 2011 | Batman: The Brave and the Bold | Himself | Episode: "Bat-Mite Presents: Batman's Strangest Cases!" |
| 2011–2016 | Adventure Time | Banana Man | 3 episodes |
| 2012 | The High Fructose Adventures of Annoying Orange | Himself | Episode: "Generic Holiday Special" |
| 2012 | DC Nation Shorts | Animal Man | 4 episodes |
| 2012, 2015 | WordGirl | The Learnerer | 3 episodes |
| 2013 | Mad | Superman / Krang | Episode: "Mad's 100th Episode Special" |
| 2014 | Wallykazam! | Wizard Jeff | Episode: "Mustache Day" |
| 2014, 2019 | My Little Pony: Friendship Is Magic | Cheese Sandwich | 2 episodes |
| 2015 | Uncle Grandpa | Pal.0/Weird Pal | Episode: "Pal.0" |
| 2015 | Gravity Falls | Probabilitor | Episode: "Dungeons, Dungeons and More Dungeons" |
| 2015 | Wander Over Yonder | Dr. Screwball Jones | 2 episodes |
| 2015, 2018 | Teen Titans Go! | Darkseid | 2 episodes |
| 2016 | Mr. Pickles | Additional voices | Episode: "Vegans" |
| 2016 | The 7D | Shapeshifter | Episode: "Shapeshifter" |
| 2016–2019 | BoJack Horseman | Captain Peanutbutter | 3 episodes |
| 2016–2019 | Milo Murphy's Law | Milo Murphy | Main role |
| 2017 | Voltron: Legendary Defender | Blumfump | Episode: "Depths" |
| 2017 | Star vs. the Forces of Evil | Preston Change-O | Episode: "Trickstar" |
| 2017 | Pig Goat Banana Cricket | Mr. Ding-a-Ling | Episode: "The Ding-A-Ling Circus" |
| 2017 | Danger & Eggs | Polka Sven | Episode: "Finding Cheryl/The Trio" |
| 2017 | Mighty Magiswords | Papa Kotassium | Episode: "Do You Know the Muffin King?" |
| 2017 | We Bare Bears | Lewis | Episode: "The Fair" |
| 2017 | Robot Chicken | Kaiju / Himself | Episode: "Hey I Found Another Sock" |
| 2018 | Little Big Awesome | Mr. Sun | 6 episodes |
| 2019 | The Adventures of Rocky and Bullwinkle | Himself | 2 episodes |
| 2019 | Happy! | Smoking Man Baby | Episode: "19 Hours and 13 Minutes" |
| 2019 | Archibald's Next Big Thing | Jasper | Episode: "Glide & Gobble/Wheelie, No Hands" |
| 2019 | Scooby-Doo and Guess Who? | Himself | Episode: "Attack of the Weird Al-Osaurus!" |
| 2019–2020 | Where's Waldo? | Wizard Artbeard | 2 episodes |
| 2020 | Blaze and the Monster Machines | The Litter Critter | Episode: "Recycling Power!" |
| 2020 | Close Enough | Himself | Episode: "The Canine Guy" |
| 2020 | American Dad! | Himself | Episode: "First, Do No Farm" |
| 2020–2022 | Pete the Cat | Wawa Weasel | 3 episodes |
| 2022 | LEGO Star Wars Summer Vacation | Vic Vankoh | Television special |
| 2022 | Hamster & Gretel | Wacko Wally | Episode: "U.F. UH-OH! Part I" |
| 2023 | Velma | Dandruff Tuba | 4 episodes |
| 2023 | Mulligan | Himself | Cameo appearance |
| 2023 | Scott Pilgrim Takes Off | Documentary Announcer | Episode: "Lights. Camera. Sparks?!" |
| 2023–2024 | Hailey's On It! | Chip Dingle / Himself | 3 episodes |
| 2024 | Firebuds | Latch | Episode: "Woodland Wiley/P.I. Piston" |
| 2024 | Transformers: EarthSpark | Cosmos | Episode: "The Butterfly Effect" |
| 2024–present | Mighty MonsterWheelies | Mayor Van Helsing | Main role |
| 2025 | SpongeBob SquarePants | I.M. Poster the Pirate | Episode: "Bizarro Bottom" |
| 2026 | Strip Law | Gordo Cippolini / Patrick | Episode: "Trophy Son (Or 'The Mother Wound')" |

=== Video games ===
| Year | Title | Role |
|---|---|---|
| 2006 | The Grim Adventures of Billy & Mandy | Announcer |
| 2026 | Grand Theft Auto VI | Vice City FM radio co-host |

=== Pinball ===
| Year | Title | Role |
|---|---|---|
| 2022 | Weird Al's Museum of Natural Hilarity | Himself |

=== Web series ===
| Year | Title | Role | Notes |
|---|---|---|---|
| 2008 | RiffTrax | Himself | "Jurassic Park" |
| 2009 | RiffTrax | Himself | "RiffTrax Live: Christmas Shorts-stravaganza!" |
| 2010 | Funny or Die | Music Producer | "Weird: The Al Yankovic Story" |
| 2012 | 5-Second Films | Himself | "Weird Owl" |
| 2013 | Funny or Die | Himself | "American Psycho with Huey Lewis and Weird Al Yankovic" |
| 2014 | Epic Rap Battles of History | Isaac Newton | "Sir Isaac Newton vs Bill Nye" |
| 2015 | CollegeHumor | Himself | "Weird Al Gets Whiplashed" |
| 2018 | Hot Ones | Himself | Season 7, Episode 12 |
| 2019 | Guest Grumps | Himself | Episode: "Wheel of Fortune w/ Special Guest WEIRD AL"; Episode: "Mom Hid My Game w/ Special Guest WEIRD AL" |

=== Theater ===
| Year | Title | Role | Notes |
|---|---|---|---|
| 2023 | Gutenberg! The Musical! | Producer | Cameo |
