= Bohemian Polka =

Bohemian Polka may refer to:

- "Bohemian Polka", a song from "Weird Al" Yankovic's album Alapalooza (a polka version of Queen's hit song "Bohemian Rhapsody")
- česká polka (Bohemian polka in translation) a term used among Czech musicians for the Polka
