= Bedrock Anthem =

1993 single by "Weird Al" Yankovic

Single by "Weird Al" Yankovic

from the album Alapalooza
- B-side: "Young, Dumb, & Ugly"
- Released: November 16, 1993
- Recorded: July 16, 1993
- Genre: Comedy; funk rock
- Length: 3:41
- Label: Scotti Brothers
- Songwriters: Flea; Frusciante; Kiedis; Smith; "Weird Al" Yankovic
- Producer: "Weird Al" Yankovic

"Weird Al" Yankovic singles chronology
"Jurassic Park" (1993)	"Bedrock Anthem" (1993)	"Achy Breaky Song" (1993)

Music video
- "Bedrock Anthem" on YouTube

"Bedrock Anthem" is a song by "Weird Al" Yankovic, which was featured on his 1993 album Alapalooza. It is a parody of "Under the Bridge" and "Give It Away", both by the Red Hot Chili Peppers and features the same funk rock musical style. The song also appears on the soundtrack album for the 1994 live-action movie version of The Flintstones, with a portion of the song played during the end credits.

This was the second time Yankovic used two songs by a band in one parody, the first being "The Plumbing Song", which was a parody of Milli Vanilli's "Baby Don't Forget My Number" and "Blame It on the Rain". "Bedrock Anthem" included clips from the actual Flintstones cartoon and, after being a part of Alapalooza, was also included in the compilation album The Essential "Weird Al" Yankovic.

== Track listing ==
1. "Bedrock Anthem" – 3:41
2. "Young, Dumb & Ugly" – 4:24

== Lyrics ==
The song portrays the narrator's desire to live in Bedrock, the setting of TV's The Flintstones, citing such perks as being the first Rolling Stone subscriber. The song features an audio clip of The Flintstones, which makes a corresponding appearance in the video.

Yankovic stated that, "I knew there was a Flintstones movie coming out, and I figured that for once I'd have my song out before the actual phenomenon. So I got to predate the movie by seven months. I'd always wanted to do a tribute to the Flintstones because I think they're a big part of pop culture. I did a lot of research, really immersed myself in the Flintstones. I watched over 100 Flintstones episodes, because I had to not only re-familiarize myself with the characters, I had to find actual sound bites and animation from the series to use in the song and the video."

== Music video ==
The video for "Bedrock Anthem" begins as a parody of the "Under the Bridge" video during the song's slow introduction, before shifting to a parody of the "Give it Away" video for the remainder of the song. For this latter part, Yankovic and his band found what they believed was the exact spot that the Red Hot Chili Peppers has used, including notable landmarks including a bush of which Flea had performed in front. The initial segment also parodies the prologue of the video for Blind Melon's "No Rain", with Heather DeLoach reprising her role as the tapdancing girl in the bee costume, who gets pushed off the stage by Jim West when she finishes her routine. The music video was Yankovic's full video directing debut, following from the short segment from the end of his 1986's "Christmas at Ground Zero" video.

== Reaction from Red Hot Chili Peppers ==
According to Yankovic's Behind the Music episode, the Red Hot Chili Peppers were not very impressed with the parody, although they approved of Yankovic's work. Bassist Flea later stated:

I didn't think it was very good. I enjoy Weird Al's things, but I found it unimaginative. It wasn't that great. Yabba Dabba Doo. I like Weird Al and everything. But you know everyone is hit or miss, except for me, of course.

== Personnel ==
According to the liner notes of The Essential "Weird Al" Yankovic:

- "Weird Al" Yankovic – lead vocal
- Jim West – guitars
- Steve Jay – bass guitar
- Jon "Bermuda" Schwartz – drums, tambourine, jaw harp
- Alan Reed – voice of Fred Flintstone
- Mel Blanc – voice of Barney Rubble and Dino
