= Jurassic Park (song) =

1993 song by "Weird Al" Yankovic

Single by "Weird Al" Yankovic

from the album Alapalooza
- B-side: "Frank's 2000" TV"
- Released: October 1993
- Recorded: July 16, 1993
- Genre: Comedy; baroque pop
- Length: 3:53
- Label: Scotti Brothers
- Songwriters: Jimmy Webb; Al Yankovic
- Producer: "Weird Al" Yankovic

"Weird Al" Yankovic singles chronology
"Taco Grande" (1992)	"Jurassic Park" (1993)	"Bedrock Anthem" (1993)

Music video
- "Jurassic Park" on YouTube

"Jurassic Park" is a parody of Richard Harris's version of Jimmy Webb's song "MacArthur Park", written and performed by "Weird Al" Yankovic; it was released both as a single and as part of Yankovic's Alapalooza album in October 1993. "Jurassic Park" was penned by Yankovic after he remembered the enjoyment he had when he combined a classic rock track with a recent movie theme with his 1985 song "Yoda". Yankovic decided to combine the plot of the recent movie Jurassic Park—a film about a park on a fictional island where geneticists have succeeded in cloning dinosaurs—with the classic Richard Harris track "MacArthur Park".

The song was paired with an elaborately animated music video, which was created by Mark Osborne and Scott Nordlund almost entirely via claymation. The video did not receive extensive play on MTV, although it was popular on The Box, VH1, and in Canada, where it was played on MuchMusic. The video, due to its animation, also later went on to be praised at various animation festivals worldwide.

"Jurassic Park" was met with mixed to positive reviews; while many reviewers enjoyed Yankovic's humor, others felt that the song did not satirize the source material, but instead merely recounted the plot to the movie. Webb himself was very pleased with the final result and has been known to sing the parody lyrics in concert. Although the single did not chart in the United States, it peaked at number 5 on the Canadian magazine The Record's single chart. The video was also nominated at the 37th Grammy Awards for Best Short Form Music Video.

== Writing ==
Yankovic was inspired to write the song after he heard The Kinks' song "Lola" while driving in his car one day, noting, "I was driving a rent-a-car through Florida when the song 'Lola' came on the radio, and it got me thinking about how much fun I had doing 'Yoda' [a song from 1985's Dare to Be Stupid] where I took a then-current topic and combined it with a classic rock tune." He soon turned his attention to the then-recently-released film Jurassic Park, based on the eponymous 1990 novel by Michael Crichton, which involved a group of scientists visiting the titular park located on the fictional island of Isla Nublar, where geneticists have successfully created genetically-engineered dinosaurs. Deciding to write a parody about the movie, he considered various songs to spoof, eventually deciding on the 1968 hit single "MacArthur Park", which was performed by Richard Harris. Yankovic approached the original song's writer, Jimmy Webb, who agreed to the idea and was so amused by the parody that he later penned a letter to Yankovic that read, "Well, [this parody] oughta [sic] bury that song once and for all!" Additionally, Crichton and director Steven Spielberg permitted Yankovic to produce the track.

== Recording and lyrics ==
"Jurassic Park" (sample)
"Jurassic Park", from Yankovic's 1993 album Alapalooza. Parodying "MacArthur Park" by Jimmy Webb, although the song was originally performed by Richard Harris in 1968, the lyrics talk about the narrator's visit to Jurassic Park and all the bad things that followed.

Yankovic entered the studio to record "Jurassic Park" on July 16, 1993. Backing Yankovic were Jon "Bermuda" Schwartz on drums, Steve Jay on bass, and Jim West on guitar. "MacArthur Park" contained an actual orchestra complete with a strings section. "Jurassic Park", however, features synth strings courtesy of keyboardist Brad Buxer, who programmed the section himself. Intermixed during the interlude are various dinosaur sound effects courtesy of Sandy Berman; Berman had previously created similar sounds for a theme park attraction, and loaned Yankovic the sound effects. At 3:53 in length, the song is considerably shorter than the original, which clocks in at 7:21. Largely, this is due to the fact that the middle section featured in the original—the so called "After the Loves of My Life" section—is omitted from Yankovic's parody.

The song itself recounts both the plot of the movie, and contains various in-jokes and references therein. One line about lawyers—"A huge tyrannosaurus ate our lawyer / Well, I suppose that proves they're really not all bad"—was deliberately placed in the song to be ambiguous, as it could either be referring to lawyers or dinosaurs as being "not all bad". The song also makes various pop culture references, mentioning both E tickets and Barney.

== Music video ==
A claymation version of "Weird Al" Yankovic, surrounded by dinosaurs. The video was directed by Mark Osborne and Scott Nordlund, and completed in two months.

When it came time for a video for "Jurassic Park", Yankovic opted to use stop-motion and claymation; he joked during a Q&A that this was because "it's just too hard to find real live dinosaurs these days." "Jurassic Park" was Yankovic's first video that was entirely animated—previous videos, such as "Money for Nothing/Beverly Hillbillies" and "Dare to Be Stupid" had featured elements of animation. The video was directed by Mark Osborne and Scott Nordlund. Yankovic initially heard of the duo from Bill Manspeaker, the lead singer of the comedy rock band Green Jellÿ. After being hired for the project, the two "basically turned a private residence in Los Angeles into a clay animation studio." The two worked between July and August 1993, and slept in shifts, so that the final project would be ready for its release in October 1993. Yankovic remained hands-off in its creation, allowing the two full creative freedom for the video. One critic noted that the music video seems to have been done in the style of Will Vinton's Dinosaur! A Fun-Filled Trip Back in Time! The video parodies scenes from, as well as the general plot of, the 1993 movie, and contains a myriad of sight-gags—as is usual for Yankovic's videos—such as a claymation version of Steven Spielberg running from dinosaurs, Barney having his head bitten off, and a Velociraptor attempting to break down a door, only to realize it has a key.

== Release ==
=== Reception ===
"Jurassic Park" was released as the lead single from Yankovic's 1993 album Alapalooza. The single did not chart in the United States, but it sold well in Canada, where it peaked at number 5 on the Canadian magazine The Record's single chart. The video for "Jurassic Park" received light rotation on MTV. Yankovic later explained in an interview that "[MTV] played it a few times, and then just yanked it, because it wasn't really part of their sound." In contrast, the single was a success on The Box and they played it "incessantly". Furthermore, in Canada, the song was a massive success on MuchMusic, making Alapalooza Yankovic's best selling album in Canada, with over 200,000 units sold, according to Music Canada. However, the video was played and remained popular on VH1 well after its release; it ranked within the Top 50 Most-Played Clips during the months of August and September 1999, according to Billboard magazine. The video for "Jurassic Park" was nominated for a Grammy Award for Best Short Form Music Video at the 37th Grammy Awards, but lost to the video for "Love Is Strong" by The Rolling Stones. Nonetheless, it received attention in animation festivals worldwide for its use of claymation effects.

Jimmy Webb was particularly pleased with the finished product. According to Yankovic, several times during different concerts in New York and Los Angeles that Yankovic was in attendance, Webb would start to perform the original, feign forgetting the words, and then invite Yankovic on stage to help him sing "Jurassic Park" instead. For a Christmas present one year, Webb even sent Yankovic a rubber dinosaur mask as a joke. Yankovic later noted that Webb "was the coolest".

Yankovic referred to the song during his Rifftrax commentary for Jurassic Park, declaring, "Jurassic Park in the light? Not so frightening."

=== Reviews ===
Chris Hicks of the Deseret News called the single "absolutely hilarious", and rhetorically asked "who else would think of adapting that ridiculously popular movie's themes to new lyrics for Jimmy Webb's classic ditty 'MacArthur Park'?" Hicks felt that the song's funniest moments involved the jokes revolving around lawyers and the mention of Barney. Amanda Cohen of the Pittsburgh Post-Gazette wrote that it combined "the schlock of the original song with schtick about the dinosaur movie" and proved that "Yankovic is as funny as ever". Furthermore, she noted that it was evidence that "his voice improves with every new release". In a review of the Spike and Mike's Festival of Animation, Arthur Salm called the piece a "knockout" and praised the humor, specifically highlighting the claymation cameo of Steven Spielberg and the "goofy velociraptor" from the opening of the video.

Some critics felt that the song did not satirize the source material, but instead merely regurgitated the plot to Jurassic Park. Entertainment Weekly referred to the claymation video for the "Jurassic Park" as "clever but toothless". The magazine argued that Yankovic's parody did not lampoon the original material, but instead transposed new elements on top of them. Rob Owen of Richmond Times-Dispatch wrote that the song "does nothing but recount the plot of the hit movie" and that "dinosaurs don't lend themselves to music".

== Track listing ==
CD single

1. "Jurassic Park" – 3:53
2. "Frank's 2000" TV" – 4:04

== Credits and personnel ==
- "Weird" Al Yankovic – vocals, background vocals, keyboards, production, arrangement
- Jim West – guitar
- Steve Jay – bass guitar
- Jon "Bermuda" Schwartz – drums, tambourine, cymbals and timpani
- Brad Buxer – keyboards, synthetic orchestration
- Sandy Berman – dinosaur growls
- Tony Papa – engineering

== Charts ==
Chart performance for "Jurassic Park"
Chart (1994)	Peak position
Australia (ARIA)	84
Canada (The Record)	5

== See also ==
- List of singles by "Weird Al" Yankovic
- List of songs by "Weird Al" Yankovic
