= Achy Breaky Song =

1993 single by "Weird Al" Yankovic

Promotional single by "Weird Al" Yankovic

from the album Alapalooza
- Released: December 7, 1993
- Recorded: July 16, 1993
- Genre: Country; comedy; parody
- Length: 3:23
- Label: Scotti Brothers
- Songwriters: Don Von Tress; "Weird Al" Yankovic
- Producer: "Weird Al" Yankovic

"Weird Al" Yankovic singles chronology
"Bedrock Anthem" (1993)	"Achy Breaky Song" (1993)	"Headline News" (1994)

"Achy Breaky Song" is a country song by American song parodist "Weird Al" Yankovic, released on his album Alapalooza, parodying the song "Achy Breaky Heart" by Billy Ray Cyrus. The song details a disgruntled listener's disdain for the song ("Don't play that song, that achy breaky song..."), as well as several alternatives he would rather endure, rather than having to listen to it anymore. These even include physical torture such as being "tie[d]... to a chair and kick[ed]... down the stairs" and even telling the DJ to "scrape his fingernails across the board".

"Achy Breaky Song" was Yankovic's first single to get considerable airplay on country radio stations. The liner notes for the album Alapalooza state that "All songwriting proceeds from Achy Breaky Song will be donated to the United Cerebral Palsy Association." Yankovic stated that this was done because since the song itself was so "mean-spirited" he thought that he might as well donate the money earned to a charitable cause.

The song references any artists from the 1960s to the 1990s (Donny & Marie, Barry Manilow, New Kids on the Block, the Village People, Vanilla Ice, the Bee Gees, Debby Boone, ABBA, Slim Whitman, Gheorghe Zamfir, Yoko Ono and Tiffany) as artists the narrator would rather listen to than "Achy Breaky Heart." Yankovic had previously recorded parodies of songs by New Kids on the Block and Tiffany.

Eighteen years later, Yankovic parodied Cyrus' daughter Miley on the 2011 album Alpocalypse, with the song "Party in the CIA". Yankovic's version includes references to torture in the lyrics, and is a parody of the latter Cyrus' song "Party in the U.S.A.".
