= Rupert Perry =

British music executive

Rupert Perry CBE is a British record label executive. He was educated at the Beaudesert School from 1955 to 1961 and at Gresham's School from 1962 to 1964. He started his music business career in 1967 after joining Campbell Connelly Music Publishers in their background music library. In 1969 he joined Louvigny Music Publishing, a Radio Luxembourg company. He was a high-ranking member of the EMI Record Corporation. After joining EMI Music in 1971, he was given various promotions. In 1976 he was appointed Vice President of the Artist and Repertoire Department for Capitol Records in the US. In 1982 he was appointed as President of EMI America. From 1986 to 1995, Perry served as President of EMI Records UK, followed by a promotion to President of EMI Europe until 1999, when he became Senior Worldwide Vice President of EMI Music.

During his time at EMI, Perry was Chairman of the UK Music Trade Association of British Phonographic Industries (BPI) from 1993 to 1995. He also served as Chairman of the European Board of the International Federation of Phonographic Industries (IFPI) from 1998 to 2000.

He has received various awards for serving the world's music industry including a CBE in the Queen's Honour List in 1997 and the IFPI Medal in 2004 for international service to the industry.

In 2006 Perry helped to write the book Northern Songs – The True Story of the Beatles Song Publishing Empire.
