= Alapalooza =

Studio album by "Weird Al" Yankovic
- Released: October 5, 1993
- Recorded: June 7, 1990; November 30, 1992 – August 18, 1993
- Genres: Comedy, parody
- Length: 44:34
- Labels: Rock 'n Roll Records; Scotti Brothers
- Producer: "Weird Al" Yankovic

"Weird Al" Yankovic chronology
The Food Album (1993)	Alapalooza (1993)	Permanent Record: Al in the Box (1994)

Singles from Alapalooza
- 1. "Jurassic Park" Released: October 1993; 2. "Bedrock Anthem" Released: November 16, 1993; 3. "Achy Breaky Song" Released: December 7, 1993 (promotional)

Alapalooza is the eighth studio album by the American parody musician "Weird Al" Yankovic, released in 1993. By the completion of his previous album, Off the Deep End, Yankovic had already written all of the original songs that he planned to use on his next release. This new album, which would eventually be titled Alapalooza in reference to the music festival Lollapalooza, consisted of seven original songs and five parodies. It produced three parody singles: "Jurassic Park", "Bedrock Anthem", and "Achy Breaky Song". "Jurassic Park" was a top five hit on the Canadian magazine The Record's single chart.

Among the album's original creations were "Talk Soup", a tune originally intended to replace the theme song of the television show of the same name, and "Harvey the Wonder Hamster", an oft-requested jingle from one of Yankovic's Al TV specials. A music video compilation, entitled Alapalooza: The Videos, was released the following year and contained four videos, only two of which were from its eponymous album. One of the videos, the one for "Jurassic Park", was animated entirely in the style of claymation and received a nomination for the Grammy Award for Best Short Form Music Video at the 37th Grammy Awards, losing to "Love Is Strong" from the Rolling Stones.

Alapalooza met with average to negative reception upon its release, with some critics commenting that the album seemed hurried and out of touch with contemporary music. The video offering received a similarly lukewarm response. Nonetheless, the album was certified gold in the United States by the Recording Industry Association of America by the end of the year, peaking at number 46 on the Billboard 200, and went double platinum in Canada.

== Production ==
=== Background ===
Yankovic's 1992 album Off the Deep End, his best-selling album since 1984's "Weird Al" Yankovic in 3-D, had revived his career and displayed his "credibility as an evolving artist" after the commercial failures of his 1986 work Polka Party! and his feature film UHF. By the time production for Off the Deep End was nearing completion, Yankovic had already written all of the original songs that would be eventually included on Alapalooza. Fearing that his track "I Was Only Kidding" would be outdated by the time of his next album, he rearranged Off the Deep End to allow for the song to be released with the album, saving "Waffle King" for Alapalooza. Nevertheless, "Waffle King" was released as a B-side to Off the Deep End's "Smells Like Nirvana" single, "just in case there wasn't going to be a next album".

Yankovic recorded all of the album's original songs, except "Talk Soup" and "Harvey the Wonder Hamster", by the end of 1992 and, in July 1993, recorded all of Alapalooza's remaining tracks, aside from "Livin' in the Fridge". Yankovic eventually decided to title his new album Alapalooza, a reference to the Lollapalooza music festival. The Yankovic dinosaur in the album's booklet was designed by David Peters, who had worked previously with the singer on the "Dare to Be Stupid" video.

Alapalooza was released on October 5, 1993, in the United States. Globally, some versions included a notice distinguishing it from the official Jurassic Park film soundtrack, as the two cover designs were similar. The Japanese edition contained a bonus track of Yankovic singing "Jurassic Park" in Japanese. A music video compilation for the album, entitled Alapalooza: the Videos, was released in February 1994 and contained four videos, only two of which ("Jurassic Park" and "Bedrock Anthem") were from Alapalooza.

=== Originals ===
Alapalooza contains seven original songs among its twelve tracks, although "Young, Dumb & Ugly" and "Frank's 2000" TV" were meant to be stylistic parodies of AC/DC and the early work of R.E.M., respectively. For the former, Yankovic wanted to parody the heavy metal music genre while at the same time avoiding a repetition of what had already been done by Spinal Tap. He ended up disliking the final product because he sang it "in a register that was really too high for [his] singing voice". The latter was a song about consumerism and modern electronics that described the neighborhood's envy of the eponymous character's new television.

The song "Talk Soup", which is about a man who desires to go on television to tell the world about his strange life, was originally commissioned as a new theme for the E! Entertainment Television show of the same name. Although the producers approved the lyrics and enjoyed the result, they decided against using it. "Waffle King", the track that had been intended for Off the Deep End, was written as "a song about a guy who becomes incredibly famous for doing something kinda stupid, and then starts taking himself way too seriously". Yankovic included "Harvey the Wonder Hamster", a short tune from one of his Al TV appearances, after receiving numerous requests to include it on an album.

=== Parodies ===
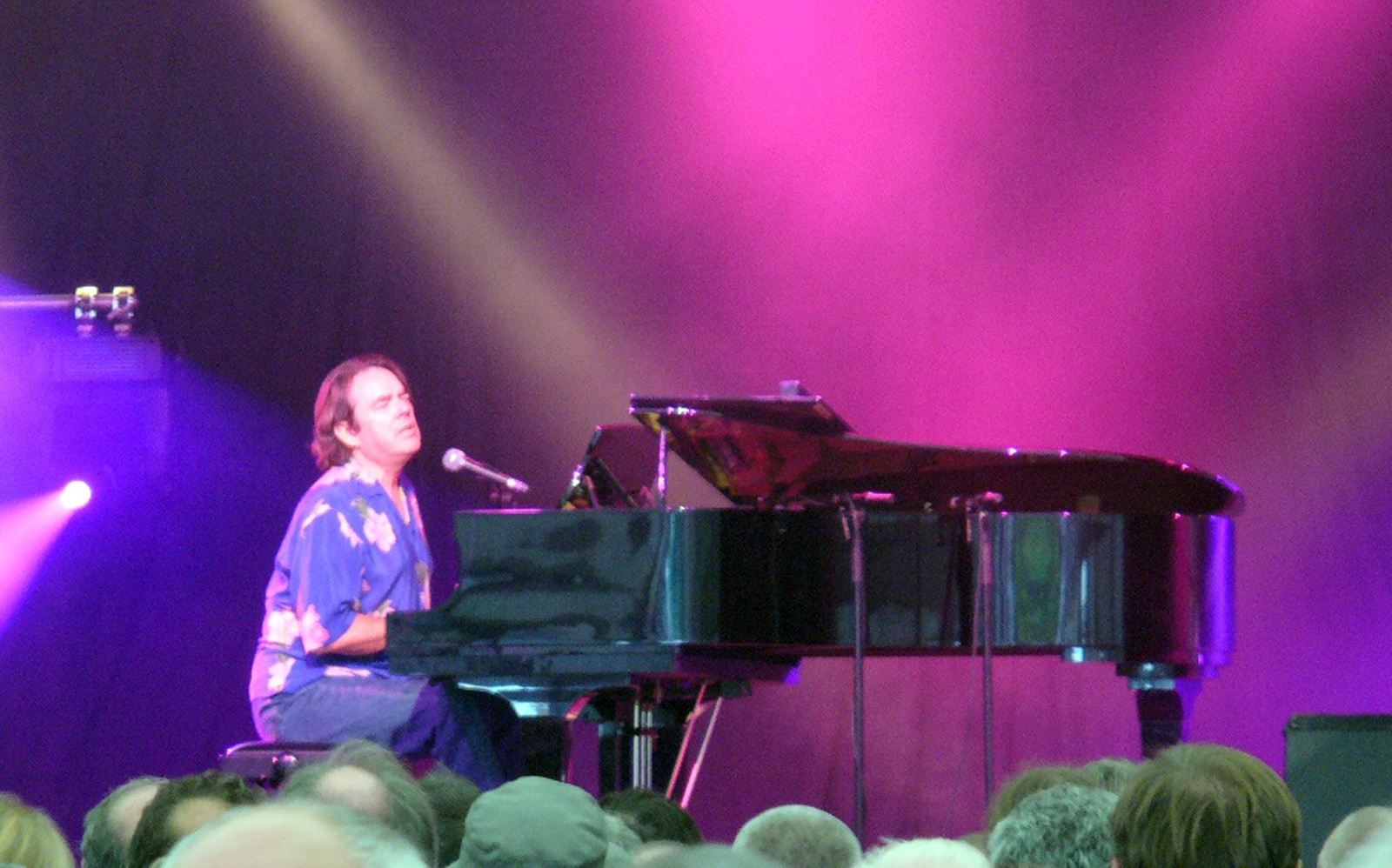
Alapalooza's lead single "Jurassic Park" is a parody of "MacArthur Park" by Jimmy Webb.

Yankovic's first single from Alapalooza was "Jurassic Park", a parody of the Jimmy Webb song "MacArthur Park" that was first performed by Richard Harris in 1968. After hearing "Lola" by The Kinks on the radio and recalling how much he had enjoyed his previous pairing of a contemporary film with a classic song (1985's "Yoda"), Yankovic came up with the idea for a tune based around the recently released Jurassic Park film. He received permission from Webb, Jurassic Park author Michael Crichton, and director Steven Spielberg to produce the track. For the music video Yankovic collaborated with animators Mark Osborne and Scott Nordlund to produce a claymation feature that parodied scenes from the movie; the song itself was a comedic retelling of the film's plot interspersed with the gripes about his visit to the park. The music video was directed by Osborne and Nordlund, while Yankovic came up with the original concept and ideas for some of the shots; Osborne said that the directors "came up with about half the ideas in collaboration" with Yankovic.

Having always wanted to write a tribute to The Flintstones, Yankovic next focused his energy on creating a song that he hoped would be current with the impending release of The Flintstones live action film in 1994. In order to collect sound bites and animation and "re-familiarize" himself with the characters, Yankovic watched over 100 episodes of the original show. A parody of both Red Hot Chili Peppers' "Under the Bridge" and "Give It Away", the resulting song was a comedic tribute to the program. It ended up becoming the second single released from Alapalooza. Yankovic directed the video for the single, which featured scenes of band members playing the song in Bedrock dressed as characters from the show. In the third and final single, "Achy Breaky Song", a parody of Billy Ray Cyrus' "Achy Breaky Heart", Yankovic lists things he would rather experience than having to listen to the original track. The parody received radio play on country music stations in the United States. The proceeds from the track were donated to United Cerebral Palsy, as both Don Von Tress (the songwriter of "Achy Breaky Heart") and Yankovic felt that the parody was "a little bit [...] mean-spirited".

"Livin' in the Fridge", a parody of Aerosmith's "Livin' on the Edge" that discusses leftovers that have grown sentient in the refrigerator, was the last song to be recorded for the album. With a deadline looming, Yankovic sent requests to several artists to do parodies of their songs. He ultimately went with Aerosmith because they replied first. It was recorded a month after the rest of the tracks had been finalized and less than two months prior to the album's release. The album includes a polka medley, a staple of Yankovic's albums, called "Bohemian Polka". Unlike previous medleys, which had featured portions of multiple songs, "Bohemian Polka" contains only one tune, Queen's "Bohemian Rhapsody", and is a rearrangement of the entire song as a polka.

== Reception ==
=== Critical reception ===
Professional ratings
Review scores
Source	Rating
AllMusic	2/5 stars
The Buffalo News	3/5 stars
Entertainment Weekly	C
Pitchfork	5.9/10
(The New) Rolling Stone Album Guide	2.5/5 stars

Critical response to Alapalooza ranged from average to negative. In (The New) Rolling Stone Album Guide, Alapalooza earned 2.5 stars out of 5, which ranked it somewhere between "mediocre" and "good". Anthony Violanti of The Buffalo News gave the album three stars out of five, claiming that "[o]nce again, Weird Al gets the last laugh on rock 'n' roll". Barry Weber of AllMusic, on the other hand, criticized the album for failing to engage contemporary musical trends and said it "sounds sloppy and mostly like a compilation of old B-sides". In reference to the album's polka tune, Mark Jenkins of The Washington Post wrote that it "doesn't sound all that different" from the original.

Entertainment Weekly felt that overall Alapalooza: the Videos was "amusing", but referred to the claymation video for the "Jurassic Park" as "clever but toothless". The magazine gave the collection an overall grade of "C" and argued that Yankovic's parodies did not satirize the original material, but instead transposed new elements on top of them. The video for "Jurassic Park" was nominated for a Grammy Award for Best Short Form Music Video at the 37th Grammy Awards, but lost to the video for "Love Is Strong" by the Rolling Stones. Nonetheless, it received attention in animation festivals worldwide for its use of claymation effects.

=== Commercial performance ===
Released in October 1993, Alapalooza was certified gold by the Recording Industry Association of America on December 23, 1993, representing sales of at least 500,000 units. The video compilation, released on February 1, 1994, went gold in the United States on August 14, 1995, representing sales of at least 50,000 units. In Canada the album went gold on November 16, 1993, platinum on January 31, 1994, and double platinum on February 12, 1998, representing sales of 50,000, 100,000, and 200,000 units respectively. The album peaked at number 46 on the United States' Billboard 200 chart on October 30, 1993, but produced no charting singles. In Canada, however, "Jurassic Park" was a top five hit on The Record's single chart. As of 2014, sales in the United States have exceeded 873,000 copies, according to Nielsen SoundScan.

== Track listing ==
No.	Title	Writer(s)	Parody of	Length
1.	"Jurassic Park"	Jimmy Webb, Al Yankovic	"MacArthur Park" by Richard Harris	3:55
2.	"Young, Dumb & Ugly"	Yankovic	Style parody of AC/DC	4:24
3.	"Bedrock Anthem"	Anthony Kiedis, John Frusciante, Michael "Flea" Balzary, Chad Smith, Yankovic	"Under the Bridge" and "Give It Away" by Red Hot Chili Peppers	3:43
4.	"Frank's 2000″ TV"	Yankovic	Style parody of R.E.M.'s early work	4:07
5.	"Achy Breaky Song"	Don Von Tress, Yankovic	"Achy Breaky Heart" by Billy Ray Cyrus	3:23
6.	"Traffic Jam"	Yankovic	Style parody of Prince	4:01
7.	"Talk Soup"	Yankovic	Original	4:25
8.	"Livin' in the Fridge"	Steven Tyler, Anthony Pereira, Mark Hudson, Yankovic	"Livin' on the Edge" by Aerosmith	3:35
9.	"She Never Told Me She Was a Mime"	Yankovic	Original glam rock song	4:54
10.	"Harvey the Wonder Hamster"	Yankovic	Original; from Al TV	0:21
11.	"Waffle King"	Yankovic	Style parody of Peter Gabriel	4:25
12.	"Bohemian Polka"	Freddie Mercury, Yankovic	Polka version of "Bohemian Rhapsody" by Queen with "Ear Booker Polka" by "Weird Al" Yankovic	3:39
Total length:				44:34

== Personnel ==
Credits adapted from CD liner notes.

Band members

- "Weird Al" Yankovic – lead and background vocals, keyboards, accordion
- Jim West – guitars, banjo, mandolin, background vocals
- Steve Jay – bass guitar, background vocals
- Jon "Bermuda" Schwartz – drums, percussion

Additional musicians

- Rubén Valtierra – keyboards
- Brad Buxer – keyboards, orchestral arrangements and programming (track 1)
- Warren Luening – trumpet
- Joel Peskin – clarinet, baritone saxophone
- Tommy Johnson – tuba
- Julia Waters – background vocals
- Maxine Waters – background vocals
- Sandy Berman – dinosaur sound effects
- "Musical Mike" Kieffer – musical hands
- Alan Reed – voice of Fred Flintstone
- Mel Blanc – voice of Barney Rubble and Dino

Technical

- "Weird Al" Yankovic – producer
- Tony Papa – engineer, mixing
- Colin Sauers – assistant engineer
- Jamie Dell – assistant engineer
- Bernie Grundman – mastering
- Spencer Proffer – executive producer (track 7)
- Doug Haverty – art direction
- Command A Studios – design
- David Peters – dinosaur imagery
- David Westwood – logo design
- Rocky Schenck – inside photography

== Charts and certifications ==
=== Charts ===
Chart	Peak position
US Billboard 200	46

=== Certifications ===
Country	Certification (sales thresholds)
United States	Gold
Canada	Double Platinum

=== Singles ===
Year	Song	Peak positions
Year	Song	CAN Record
1994	"Jurassic Park"	5
