= Steve Desch =

American astrophysicist

Steven Desch
- Occupation: Astrophysicist
- Employer: Arizona State University

Steven J. Desch is an American astrophysicist who, as of 2026, is a professor at Arizona State University.

Desch completed his undergraduate education at Rensselaer Polytechnic Institute, before earning master's degrees in physics and astronomy from Rensselaer and the University of Chicago, respectively. He was awarded a PhD in physics from the University of Illinois Urbana-Champaign in 1998, where he studied under the supervision of Telemachos Charalambous Mouschovias.

Asteroid 9926 Desch, a mid-sized asteroid orbiting between Mars and Jupiter, is named after him. He is the 2003 recipient of the Nier Prize from the Meteoritical Society.
