= List of songs recorded by "Weird Al" Yankovic =

"Weird Al" Yankovic is a multiple Grammy Award-winning American musician, satirist, parodist, accordionist, director, television producer, and author.

He is known in particular for humorous songs which make fun of popular culture or parody specific songs by contemporary musical acts, or both. His works have earned him three gold and five platinum records in the U.S.

== Songs on Yankovic's commercially released albums ==
Yankovic has written hundreds of songs over his entire career; however, listed below are the tracks that have appeared on his commercially sed albums. These include his fourteen studio albums and seven compilation albums.

=== Studio albums ===
- "Weird Al" Yankovic (1983)
- "Weird Al" Yankovic in 3-D (1984)
- Dare to Be Stupid (1985)
- Polka Party! (1986)
- Even Worse (1988)
- Peter and the Wolf (1988)
- UHF – Original Motion Picture Soundtrack and Other Stuff (1989)
- Off the Deep End (1992)
- Alapalooza (1993)
- Bad Hair Day (1996)
- Running with Scissors (1999)
- Poodle Hat (2003)
- Straight Outta Lynwood (2006)
- Alpocalypse (2011)
- Mandatory Fun (2014)

=== Compilation albums ===
- Eat It (1984)
- The Official Music of "Weird Al" Yankovic: Al Hits Tokyo (1984)
- "Weird Al" Yankovic's Greatest Hits (1988)
- The Best of Yankovic (1992)
- The Food Album (1993)
- Permanent Record: Al in the Box (1994)
- Greatest Hits Volume II (1994)
- The TV Album (1995)
- The Best of "Weird Al" Yankovic (1999)
- The Saga Begins (2000)
- The Essential "Weird Al" Yankovic (2009)
- The Essential "Weird Al" Yankovic 3.0 (2010)
- Squeeze Box (2017)
- Weird: The Al Yankovic Story (2022)

=== Songs ===
Each song's listing states the album or albums on which it appears, and whether the song is an original or a parody. Some songs are "style parodies", in which Yankovic emulates the general sound of a group without directly parodying one of their songs. These are listed as "Original, in the style of..."

Song	Album(s)	Original or parody
"30 Rock Theme Parody"	Medium Rarities (2017)	Parody of "30 Rock Theme" composed by Jeff Richmond. From an episode of 30 Rock.
"Aardvark"	Peter and the Wolf (1988)	Original, part of "The Carnival of the Animals – Part Two", inspired by "The Carnival of the Animals" by Camille Saint-Saëns
"Achy Breaky Song"	Alapalooza (1993); Permanent Record: Al in the Box (1994); Greatest Hits Volume II (1994)	Parody of "Achy Breaky Heart" by Billy Ray Cyrus
"Addicted to Spuds"	Polka Party! (1986) "Weird Al" Yankovic's Greatest Hits (1988); The Food Album (1993); Permanent Record: Al in the Box (1994)	Parody of "Addicted to Love" by Robert Palmer
"Airline Amy"	Off the Deep End (1992); The Best of Yankovic (1992)	Original, in the style of "Switchboard Susan" by Nick Lowe
"Albuquerque"	Running with Scissors (1999); The Essential "Weird Al" Yankovic (2009)	Original, in the style of "Dick's Automotive" by The Rugburns. Final section repeating the word "Albuquerque" parodies the end of "Education" by The Kinks.
"Alimony"	Even Worse (1988); Permanent Record: Al in the Box (1994)	Parody of "Mony Mony" as performed by Billy Idol, originally by Tommy James and the Shondells
"Alligator"	Peter and the Wolf (1988)	Original, part of "The Carnival of the Animals – Part Two", inspired by "The Carnival of the Animals" by Camille Saint-Saëns
"The Alternative Polka"	Bad Hair Day (1996)	A polka medley of...: "Loser" by Beck, "Sex Type Thing" by Stone Temple Pilots, "All I Wanna Do" by Sheryl Crow, "Closer" by Nine Inch Nails, "Bang and Blame" by R.E.M., "You Oughta Know" by Alanis Morissette, "Bullet with Butterfly Wings" by The Smashing Pumpkins, "My Friends" by Red Hot Chili Peppers, "I'll Stick Around" by Foo Fighters, "Black Hole Sun" by Soundgarden, "Basket Case" by Green Day, with new music by "Weird Al" Yankovic
"Amish Paradise"	Bad Hair Day (1996); The Essential "Weird Al" Yankovic (2009); Weird: The Al Yankovic Story (2022) (rerecorded version)	Parody of "Gangsta's Paradise" by Coolio feat. LV (which is a reworking of the Stevie Wonder song "Pastime Paradise"). Incorporates lyrics from "The Ballad of Gilligan's Isle" by Sherwood Schwartz. One extended scene in its video parodies the video to "Return to Innocence" by Enigma.
"Amoeba"	Peter and the Wolf (1988)	Original, part of "The Carnival of the Animals – Part Two", inspired by "The Carnival of the Animals" by Camille Saint-Saëns
"Angry White Boy Polka"	Poodle Hat (2003)	A polka medley of...: "Last Resort" by Papa Roach, "Chop Suey!" by System of a Down, "Get Free" by The Vines, "Hate to Say I Told You So" by The Hives, "Fell in Love with a Girl" by The White Stripes, "Last Nite" by The Strokes, "Down with the Sickness" by Disturbed, "Renegades of Funk" by Rage Against the Machine, "My Way" by Limp Bizkit, "Outside" by Staind feat. Fred Durst, "Bawitdaba" by Kid Rock, "Youth of the Nation" by P.O.D., "The Real Slim Shady" by Eminem, with new music by "Weird Al" Yankovic
"Another One Rides the Bus"	"Weird Al" Yankovic (1983); Permanent Record: Al in the Box (1994); The Essential "Weird Al" Yankovic (2009); Weird: The Al Yankovic Story (2022) (re-recorded version)	Parody of "Another One Bites the Dust" by Queen. Recorded live on The Dr. Demento Show, and performed live in 1981 on Tomorrow Coast to Coast (presented by Tom Snyder), which marks the artist's first TV appearance.
"Another Tattoo"	Alpocalypse (2011)	Parody of "Nothin' on You" by B.o.B feat. Bruno Mars
"Attack of the Radioactive Hamsters from a Planet near Mars"	UHF - Original Motion Picture Soundtrack and Other Stuff (1989)	Original
"Beat on the Brat"	Medium Rarities (2017); Weird: The Al Yankovic Story (2022) (rerecorded version)	Cover of "Beat on the Brat" by the Ramones. Also on "Dr. Demento Covered In Punk" (2018).
"Bedrock Anthem"	Alapalooza (1993); Permanent Record: Al in the Box (1994); Greatest Hits Volume II (1994); The TV Album (1995); The Essential "Weird Al" Yankovic (2009)	Parody of "Under the Bridge" and "Give It Away" by Red Hot Chili Peppers; about life in The Flintstones' city of Bedrock. Its video was shot at the same location as the "Give It Away" video and also begins with a short reference to Blind Melon's "No Rain" video.
"The Biggest Ball of Twine in Minnesota"	UHF - Original Motion Picture Soundtrack and Other Stuff (1989); Permanent Record: Al in the Box (1994); The Essential "Weird Al" Yankovic (2009)	Original, in the style of Harry Chapin (the tune is quite similar to Chapin's "30,000 Pounds of Bananas") and Gordon Lightfoot. Locations in the song come from the book Roadside America by Doug Kirby.
"Bite Me"	Off the Deep End (1992)	The "noise" song appears as a hidden track on most CD releases. It starts playing after ten minutes of silence at the end of the "You Don't Love Me Anymore" track. Inspired by Nirvana's hidden track on Nevermind.
"Bob"	Poodle Hat (2003); The Essential "Weird Al" Yankovic (2009)	Original, in the style of Bob Dylan (hence the title), very similar to "Bob Dylan's 115th Dream". Composed entirely of palindromes. Its video, based on an iconic film segment featuring "Subterranean Homesick Blues", includes a scene that alludes to the video of another homage to that Dylan tune, the INXS track "Mediate".
"Bohemian Polka"	Alapalooza (1993)	Cover of "Bohemian Rhapsody" by Queen. Lyrics are identical, music is about twice as fast and adds polka beats and sound effects.
"The Brady Bunch"	"Weird Al" Yankovic in 3-D (1984); The TV Album (1995)	Parody of "The Safety Dance" by Men Without Hats. Mentions several hit shows of the 70's and 80's and includes the original lyrics of the theme to The Brady Bunch.
"The Brain Song"	Medium Rarities (2017)	Original. From the 3-D short film Al's Brain
"Buckingham Blues"	"Weird Al" Yankovic (1983)	Original music; lyrics are a parody of "Jack & Diane" by John Mellencamp.
"Buy Me a Condo"	"Weird Al" Yankovic in 3-D (1984); Permanent Record: Al in the Box (1994)	Original, in the style of "Buffalo Soldier" by Bob Marley.
"Cable TV"	Dare to Be Stupid (1985); The TV Album (1995)	Original, in the style of "Hercules" by Elton John
"Callin' In Sick"	Bad Hair Day (1996)	Original, in the style of "Lithium" and "Come as You Are" by Nirvana.
"Canadian Idiot"	Straight Outta Lynwood (2006); The Essential "Weird Al" Yankovic (2009)	Parody of "American Idiot" by Green Day.
"Cavity Search"	Bad Hair Day (1996)	Parody of "Hold Me, Thrill Me, Kiss Me, Kill Me" by U2.
"The Check's in the Mail"	"Weird Al" Yankovic (1983)	Original
"Christmas at Ground Zero"	Polka Party! (1986); Permanent Record: Al in the Box (1994); Greatest Hits Volume II (1994)	Original, in the style of Phil Spector's Wall of Sound technique
"Close but No Cigar"	Straight Outta Lynwood (2006)	Original, in the style of Cake.
"CNR"	Internet Leaks digital EP (2009); Alpocalypse (2011)	Original, in the style of The Hives and The White Stripes, particularly Dead Leaves and the Dirty Ground. Features a guitar lick borrowed from "Rock Me Amadeus". The video was done on JibJab, using the same style as White Stripes videos.
"Cockroaches"	Peter and the Wolf (1988)	Original, part of "The Carnival of the Animals – Part Two", inspired by "The Carnival of the Animals" by Camille Saint-Saëns
"Comedy Bang! Bang! Theme"	Medium Rarities (2017)	Cover of the Comedy Bang! Bang! theme originally by Reggie Watts, used in season 5.
"A Complicated Song"	Poodle Hat (2003)	Parody of "Complicated" by Avril Lavigne. The singer laments some mishaps resulting from everyday circumstances.
"Confessions Part III"	Straight Outta Lynwood (2006)	Parody of "Confessions Part II" by Usher
"Couch Potato"	Poodle Hat (2003)	Parody of "Lose Yourself" by Eminem
"Craigslist"	Internet Leaks digital EP (2009); Alpocalypse (2011)	Original, in the style of The Doors, particularly "Twentieth Century Fox", "Soul Kitchen", and When the Music's Over". Includes a spoken part reminiscent of the Oedipus complex segment of "The End".
"Dare to Be Stupid"	Dare to Be Stupid (1985) "Weird Al" Yankovic's Greatest Hits (1988); The Transformers: The Movie (Original Motion Picture Soundtrack) (1987); Permanent Record: Al in the Box (1994); The Essential "Weird Al" Yankovic (2009); Medium Rarities (Instrumental)	Original, in the style of Devo, particularly "Big Mess". The video references "Whip It", "Satisfaction", "Beautiful World", "Jocko Homo", and "Smart Patrol". After one line, Al lip-syncs 'Yes!', taken from the Devo song "Explosions".
"Do I Creep You Out"	Straight Outta Lynwood (2006)	Parody of "Do I Make You Proud" by Taylor Hicks
"Dog Eat Dog"	Polka Party! (1986); Permanent Record: Al in the Box (1994); The Essential "Weird Al" Yankovic (2009)	Original, in the style of Talking Heads, particularly "And She Was" and "Once in a Lifetime".
"Don't Download This Song"	Straight Outta Lynwood (2006) free download at MySpace and weirdal.com The Essential "Weird Al" Yankovic (2009)	Original, in the style of 1980s benefit songs like "We Are the World" by USA for Africa, "Hands Across America", and "Do They Know It's Christmas?" The song itself is a response to and parody of "Download This Song" by MC Lars. It is also a spoof of the ending song during the credits on Dickie Roberts: Former Child Star with all the former child stars.
"Don't Wear Those Shoes"	Polka Party! (1986)	Original, although the intro is in the style of The Kinks' "Father Christmas".
"Dr. Demento Jingle"	Medium Rarities (2017)	Original.
"Eat It"	"Weird Al" Yankovic in 3-D (1984) "Weird Al" Yankovic's Greatest Hits (1988); The Best of Yankovic (1992); The Food Album (1993); Permanent Record: Al in the Box (1994); The Essential "Weird Al" Yankovic (2009); Weird: The Al Yankovic Story (2022)	Parody of "Beat It" by Michael Jackson
"eBay"	Poodle Hat (2003); The Essential "Weird Al" Yankovic (2009)	Parody of "I Want It That Way" by Backstreet Boys
"Everything You Know Is Wrong"	Bad Hair Day (1996); The Essential "Weird Al" Yankovic (2009)	Original, in the style of They Might Be Giants.
"Fat"	Even Worse (1988) "Weird Al" Yankovic's Greatest Hits (1988); The Food Album (1993); Permanent Record: Al in the Box (1994); The Essential "Weird Al" Yankovic (2009)	Parody of "Bad" by Michael Jackson. Video filmed on the same set as "Badder".
"Finale (Carnival of the Animals, Part 2)"	Peter and the Wolf (1988)	Original, part of "The Carnival of the Animals – Part Two", inspired by "The Carnival of the Animals" by Camille Saint-Saëns
"First World Problems"	Mandatory Fun (2014)	Original, in the style of the Pixies. Chorus is in the style of "Debaser".
"Foil"	Mandatory Fun (2014)	Parody of "Royals" by Lorde
"Frank's 2000" TV"	Alapalooza (1993); Permanent Record: Al in the Box (1994); The TV Album (1995); The Essential "Weird Al" Yankovic (2009)	Original, in the style of R.E.M.'s "(Don't Go Back To) Rockville", "Near Wild Heaven" and other songs.
"Fun Zone"	UHF - Original Motion Picture Soundtrack and Other Stuff (1989)	Original – "Fun Zone" does not really have lyrics. People occasionally say "yeah" and other similar phrases, but it's generally just instrumental. In the movie UHF, an excerpt of the song played in the background when Stanley rode out in the miniature fire engine at the beginning of an episode of Stanley Spadowski's Clubhouse. Originally written for the TV show Welcome to the Fun Zone.
"Gandhi II"	UHF - Original Motion Picture Soundtrack and Other Stuff (1989)	Excerpt from UHF. Music is in the style of "Theme from Shaft" by Isaac Hayes.
"Generic Blues"	UHF - Original Motion Picture Soundtrack and Other Stuff (1989); Permanent Record: Al in the Box (1994)	Original, in the style of Chicago blues
"Genius in France"	Poodle Hat (2003)	Original, in the style of Frank Zappa. Frank's son, Dweezil Zappa, plays the opening guitar solo.
"George of the Jungle"	Dare to Be Stupid (1985)	Cover version of the theme song to the 1967 animated cartoon series George of the Jungle written by Sheldon Allman and Stan Worth.
"Germs"	Running with Scissors (1999)	Original, in the style of Nine Inch Nails (quite similar to the songs "Closer" and "Terrible Lie").
"Girls Just Want to Have Lunch"	Dare to Be Stupid (1985)	Parody of "Girls Just Want to Have Fun" as performed by Cyndi Lauper, originally by Robert Hazard.
"Good Enough for Now"	Polka Party! (1986)	Original, in the style of traditional Country/Western ballads, complete with steel guitar.
"Good Old Days"	Even Worse (1988); Permanent Record: Al in the Box (1994); The Essential "Weird Al" Yankovic (2009)	Original, in the style of James Taylor, particularly "Only One". In one of Al's many appearances on The Dr. Demento Show, he described this song as something one might expect to hear if James Taylor and Charles Manson ever collaborated on a song.
"Gotta Boogie"	"Weird Al" Yankovic (1983)	Original, in the style of 1970's Disco music.
"Grapefruit Diet"	Running with Scissors (1999)	Parody of "Zoot Suit Riot" by Cherry Poppin' Daddies
"Gump"	Bad Hair Day (1996); The Essential "Weird Al" Yankovic (2009)	Parody of "Lump" by The Presidents of the United States of America. Lyrics recount the plot of Forrest Gump.
"Handle with Care"	George Fest (2016)	originally by The Traveling Wilburys with Brandon Flowers, Dhani Harrison, Jonathan Bates, Britt Daniel and Wayne Coyne
"Handy"	Mandatory Fun (2014)	Parody of "Fancy" by Iggy Azalea featuring Charli XCX
"Happy Birthday" (Album Version)	"Weird Al" Yankovic (1983); Medium Rarities (New version)	Original, in the style of Tonio K's "H.A.T.R.E.D."
"Happy Birthday" (Single Version)	Permanent Record: Al in the Box (1994)	Original, in the style of Tonio K's "H.A.T.R.E.D."
"Hardware Store"	Poodle Hat (2003); The Essential "Weird Al" Yankovic (2009)	Original
"Harvey the Wonder Hamster"	Alapalooza (1993); Permanent Record: Al in the Box (1994)	Original; a re-recording of a recurring jingle from Yankovic's Al TV television specials.
"Headline News"	Permanent Record: Al in the Box (1994); Greatest Hits Volume II (1994); Medium Rarities (2017)	Parody of "Mmm Mmm Mmm Mmm" by Crash Test Dummies. Lyrics recount three well-known tabloid stories of 1993 and 1994. In order, the capsulized stories are those of Michael P. Fay, who was caned in Singapore for vandalism, Tonya Harding, who hired Shane Stant to club the kneecap of her figure-skating rival Nancy Kerrigan, and Lorena Bobbitt, who emasculated her husband after he sexually assaulted her. Though these stories sounded horrific, a humorous slant was necessarily added, especially after the mass amount of press each story garnered.
"Here's Johnny"	Polka Party! (1986); Permanent Record: Al in the Box (1994); The TV Album (1995)	Parody of "Who's Johnny (Short Circuit Theme)" by El DeBarge. Homage to Ed McMahon, announcer of The Tonight Show Starring Johnny Carson, who introduced Carson with the words "Here's Johnny!"
"Hey, Hey, We're the Monks"	Medium Rarities (2017)	Original. From the episode "Completely Mad ... Alena" of Galavant
"Homer and Marge"	The Simpsons Testify; Medium Rarities (2017)	Parody of "Jack & Diane" by John Mellencamp. From The Simpsons episode "Three Gays of the Condo".
"Hooked on Polkas"	Dare to Be Stupid (1985); Permanent Record: Al in the Box (1994)	A polka medley of...: "Twelfth Street Rag" by Euday L. Bowman, "State of Shock" by The Jackson 5 with Mick Jagger, "Sharp Dressed Man" by ZZ Top, "What's Love Got to Do with It?" by Tina Turner, "Method of Modern Love" by Hall & Oates, "Owner of a Lonely Heart" by Yes, "We're Not Gonna Take It" by Twisted Sister, "99 Luftballons" by Nena, "Footloose" by Kenny Loggins, "The Reflex" by Duran Duran, "Metal Health" by Quiet Riot, and; "Relax" by Frankie Goes to Hollywood; with new music by "Weird Al" Yankovic
"The Hot Rocks Polka"	UHF - Original Motion Picture Soundtrack and Other Stuff (1989)	A polka medley of...: "It's Only Rock 'n Roll (But I Like It)", "Brown Sugar", "You Can't Always Get What You Want", "Honky Tonk Women", "Under My Thumb", "Ruby Tuesday", "Miss You", "Sympathy for the Devil", "Get Off of My Cloud"; "Shattered", "Let's Spend the Night Together", and; "(I Can't Get No) Satisfaction", all by The Rolling Stones, with arrangement and new music by "Weird Al" Yankovic
"Hummingbirds"	Peter and the Wolf (1988)	Original, part of "The Carnival of the Animals – Part Two", inspired by "The Carnival of the Animals" by Camille Saint-Saëns
"It's My World (And We're All Living in It)"	Medium Rarities (2017)	Original. Theme to Milo Murphy's Law
"I Can't Watch This"	Off the Deep End (1992); Permanent Record: Al in the Box (1994); The TV Album (1995)	Parody of "U Can't Touch This" by MC Hammer
"I Lost on Jeopardy"	"Weird Al" Yankovic in 3-D (1984) "Weird Al" Yankovic's Greatest Hits (1988); Permanent Record: Al in the Box (1994); The TV Album (1995); The Essential "Weird Al" Yankovic (2009)	Parody of "Jeopardy" by the Greg Kihn Band. Art Fleming and Don Pardo, respectively the host and announcer of the original version of Jeopardy!, made cameos in the video, as did Al's mentor Dr. Demento, Al's parents, and Greg Kihn himself.
"I Love Rocky Road"	"Weird Al" Yankovic (1983); The Food Album (1993); Permanent Record: Al in the Box (1994); Weird: The Al Yankovic Story (2022) (rerecorded version)	Parody of "I Love Rock 'n' Roll" as performed by Joan Jett and the Blackhearts, originally by Arrows
"Inactive"	Mandatory Fun (2014)	Parody of "Radioactive" by Imagine Dragons
"I Remember Larry"	Bad Hair Day (1996)	Original, in the style of "Calling All Girls" by Hilly Michaels. Reversing a segment of the song near the end reveals the hidden backwards message "Wow, you must have an awful lot of free time on your hands".
"I Think I'm a Clone Now"	Even Worse (1988); Permanent Record: Al in the Box (1994)	Parody of "I Think We're Alone Now" as performed by Tiffany, originally by Tommy James and the Shondells
"I Want a New Duck"	Dare to Be Stupid (1985); Permanent Record: Al in the Box (1994)	Parody of "I Want a New Drug" by Huey Lewis and the News
"I Was Only Kidding"	Off the Deep End (1992); The Best of Yankovic (1992)	Original, in the style of Tonio K
"If That Isn't Love"	Alpocalypse (2011)	Original, in the style of Hanson
"Iguana"	Peter and the Wolf (1988)	Original, part of "The Carnival of the Animals – Part Two", inspired by "The Carnival of the Animals" by Camille Saint-Saëns
"I'll Be Mellow When I'm Dead"	"Weird Al" Yankovic (1983)	Original
"I'll Sue Ya"	Straight Outta Lynwood (2006); The Essential "Weird Al" Yankovic (2009)	Original, in the style of Rage Against the Machine. Notably similar in parts to "Bombtrack" and "Killing in the Name".
"I'm So Sick of You"	Bad Hair Day (1996)	Original, in the style of Elvis Costello.
"Introduction (Carnival of the Animals, Part 2)"	Peter and the Wolf (1988)	Original, part of "The Carnival of the Animals – Part Two", inspired by "The Carnival of the Animals" by Camille Saint-Saëns
"Introduction (Peter and the Wolf)"	Peter and the Wolf (1988)	Parody of "Peter and the Wolf" by Sergei Prokofiev
"Isle Thing"	UHF - Original Motion Picture Soundtrack and Other Stuff (1989)	Parody of "Wild Thing" by Tone Lōc. Describes the TV series Gilligan's Island
"It's All About the Pentiums"	Running with Scissors (1999); The Essential "Weird Al" Yankovic (2009)	Parody of "It's All About the Benjamins" by Puff Daddy containing an interpolation of "I Did It for Love"
"Jackson Park Express"	Mandatory Fun (2014)	Original, in the style of Cat Stevens.
"Jerry Springer"	Running with Scissors (1999)	Parody of "One Week" by the Barenaked Ladies
"Jurassic Park"	Alapalooza (1993); Permanent Record: Al in the Box (1994); Greatest Hits Volume II (1994); The Essential "Weird Al" Yankovic (2009); Medium Rarities (Jurashiku Park – Japanese version)	Parody of "MacArthur Park" as performed by Richard Harris (written by Jimmy Webb). Recaps the plot of the film Jurassic Park. The music video was approved by Steven Spielberg, who directed the film.
"King of Suede"	"Weird Al" Yankovic in 3-D (1984); Permanent Record: Al in the Box (1994)	Parody of "King of Pain" by The Police
"Lame Claim to Fame"	Mandatory Fun (2014)	Original, in the style of Southern Culture on the Skids
"Lasagna"	Even Worse (1988) "Weird Al" Yankovic's Greatest Hits (1988); The Best of Yankovic (1992); The Food Album (1993); Permanent Record: Al in the Box (1994); The Essential "Weird Al" Yankovic (2009)	Parody of "La Bamba", traditional Mexican folk song, as performed by Los Lobos (based on a version of the song recorded by Ritchie Valens).
"Let Me Be Your Hog"	UHF - Original Motion Picture Soundtrack and Other Stuff (1989)	Original
"Let the Pun Fit the Crime"	Medium Rarities (2017)	Original. From the episode "The Boy Wander" of Wander Over Yonder.
"Like a Surgeon"	Dare to Be Stupid (1985) "Weird Al" Yankovic's Greatest Hits (1988); The Best of Yankovic (1992); Permanent Record: Al in the Box (1994); The Essential "Weird Al" Yankovic (2009); Weird: The Al Yankovic Story (2022) (rerecorded version)	Parody of "Like a Virgin" by Madonna.
"Livin' in the Fridge"	Alapalooza (1993); Permanent Record: Al in the Box (1994)	Parody of "Livin' on the Edge" by Aerosmith
"Living with a Hernia"	Polka Party! (1986) "Weird Al" Yankovic's Greatest Hits (1988); The Best of Yankovic (1992); Permanent Record: Al in the Box (1994)	Parody of "Living in America" by James Brown. The video was shot on the same stage where Brown's scenes in Rocky IV, which featured "Living in America", had been shot.
"Lousy Haircut"	Medium Rarities (2017)	Parody of "Firestarter" by The Prodigy. Performed on The Weird Al Show.
"Melanie"	Even Worse (1988); Permanent Record: Al in the Box (1994); The Essential "Weird Al" Yankovic (2009)	Original. Chorus in the style of "You're My Favorite Waste of Time" by Marshall Crenshaw.
"Midnight Star"	"Weird Al" Yankovic in 3-D (1984); Permanent Record: Al in the Box (1994)	Original. Lyrics based on supermarket tabloid headlines. Most of the headlines in the song were actual tabloid headlines.
"Mission Statement"	Mandatory Fun (2014)	Original, in the style of Crosby, Stills, Nash and Young. Takes elements from "Carry On" and "Suite: Judy Blue Eyes".
"Money for Nothing/Beverly Hillbillies"	UHF - Original Motion Picture Soundtrack and Other Stuff (1989); Permanent Record: Al in the Box (1994); The TV Album (1995)	Parody of "Money for Nothing" by Dire Straits; lyrics based on the theme from The Beverly Hillbillies. Dire Straits frontman Mark Knopfler re-recorded his guitar tracks for this song, although he did not appear in its video.
"Mr. Frump in the Iron Lung"	"Weird Al" Yankovic (1983)	Original
"Mr. Popeil"	"Weird Al" Yankovic in 3-D (1984); Permanent Record: Al in the Box (1994)	Original, in the style of The B-52's, particularly "Rock Lobster" and "There's a Moon in the Sky". Refers to Ron Popeil. Ron Popeil's daughter sings backing vocals.
"My Baby's in Love with Eddie Vedder"	Running with Scissors (1999)	Original, in the style of zydeco. (Eddie Vedder is the lead singer of Pearl Jam)
"My Bologna"	"Weird Al" Yankovic (1983); The Food Album (1993); Permanent Record: Al in the Box (1994) (early copies); Medium Rarities (Capitol single version); Weird: The Al Yankovic Story (2022) (rerecorded)	Parody of "My Sharona" by The Knack, and the artist's debut single.
"My Own Eyes"	Mandatory Fun (2014)	Original, in the style of Foo Fighters (Also includes the main riff from Velvet Revolver's "Slither").
"Nature Trail to Hell"	"Weird Al" Yankovic in 3-D (1984)	Original (contains the hidden intentional backwards message, "Satan eats Cheez Whiz".)
"The Night Santa Went Crazy"	Bad Hair Day (1996); The Essential "Weird Al" Yankovic (2009); Medium Rarities (Extra Gory version)	Original, in the style of "Black Gold" by Soul Asylum. The intro to the song is also very similar to Zakk Wylde's intro in the Ozzy Osbourne song "Mama, I'm Coming Home".
"NOW That's What I Call Polka!"	Mandatory Fun (2014)	A polka medley of...: "Too Fat Polka" by Arthur Godfrey; "Wrecking Ball" by Miley Cyrus; "Pumped Up Kicks" by Foster the People; "Best Song Ever" by One Direction; "Gangnam Style" by Psy; "Call Me Maybe" by Carly Rae Jepsen; "Scream & Shout" by will.i.am featuring Britney Spears; "Somebody That I Used to Know" by Gotye featuring Kimbra; "Timber" by Pitbull featuring Kesha; "Sexy and I Know It" by LMFAO; "Thrift Shop" by Macklemore & Ryan Lewis featuring Wanz; "Get Lucky" by Daft Punk featuring Pharrell Williams; with new music by "Weird Al" Yankovic
"Ode to a Superhero"	Poodle Hat (2003)	Parody of "Piano Man" by Billy Joel. Describes the events of the 2002 film Spider-Man.
"One of Those Days"	Polka Party! (1986)	Original
"One More Minute"	Dare to Be Stupid (1985) "Weird Al" Yankovic's Greatest Hits (1988); The Best of Yankovic (1992); Permanent Record: Al in the Box (1994); The Essential "Weird Al" Yankovic (2009)	Original, in the style of doo-wop. In concert, Al emulates Elvis Presley's mannerisms by giving concert-goers scarves from around his neck and having himself followed by a bodyguard as he walks through the audience.
"Pac-Man"	Medium Rarities (2017)	Parody of "Taxman" by The Beatles. Also on Dr. Demento's Basement Tapes No. 4.
"Pancreas"	Straight Outta Lynwood (2006); The Essential "Weird Al" Yankovic (2009)	Original, in the style of Brian Wilson/the Pet Sounds- and Smile-era Beach Boys, specifically "Our Prayer/Gee", "Wouldn't It Be Nice", "God Only Knows", "Wind Chimes", "Heroes and Villains" and "Good Vibrations".
"Party at the Leper Colony"	Poodle Hat (2003)	Original, in the style of John Cafferty & The Beaver Brown Band, specifically "On the Dark Side".
"Party in the CIA"	Alpocalypse (2011)	Parody of "Party in the U.S.A." by Miley Cyrus
"Perform This Way"	"Perform This Way" – Single (2011); Alpocalypse (2011)	Parody of "Born This Way" by Lady Gaga
"Peter and the Wolf"	Peter and the Wolf (1988)	Parody of "Peter and the Wolf" by Sergei Prokofiev
"Phony Calls"	Bad Hair Day (1996)	Parody of "Waterfalls" by TLC. Contains references to Bart Simpson's habit of prank calling Moe Szyslak, including a sample from the Season 2 Simpsons episode "Blood Feud".
"Pigeons"	Peter and the Wolf (1988)	Original, part of "The Carnival of the Animals – Part Two", inspired by "The Carnival of the Animals" by Camille Saint-Saëns
"The Plumbing Song"	Off the Deep End (1992); The Best of Yankovic (1992)	Parody of "Baby Don't Forget My Number" and "Blame It on the Rain" by Milli Vanilli
"Polka Face"	Alpocalypse (2011)	A polka medley of...: "Liechtensteiner Polka"; "Poker Face" by Lady Gaga, "Womanizer" by Britney Spears, "Right Round" by Flo Rida, "Day 'n' Nite" by Kid Cudi, "Need You Now" by Lady Antebellum, "Baby" by Justin Bieber, "So What" by P!nk, "I Kissed a Girl" by Katy Perry, "Fireflies" by Owl City, "Blame It" by Jamie Foxx, "Replay" by Iyaz, "Down" by Jay Sean, "Break Your Heart" by Taio Cruz, "The Tick Tock Polka" by Frankie Yankovic, "Tik Tok" by Ke$ha, "Poker Face" (Reprise) by Lady Gaga, with new music by "Weird Al" Yankovic
"Polka Party!"	Polka Party! (1986)	A polka medley of...: "Sledgehammer" by Peter Gabriel, "Sussudio" by Phil Collins, "Party All the Time" by Eddie Murphy, "Say You, Say Me" by Lionel Richie, "Freeway of Love" by Aretha Franklin, "What You Need" by INXS, "Harlem Shuffle" by The Rolling Stones, "Venus" by Bananarama, "Nasty" by Janet Jackson, "Rock Me Amadeus" by Falco, "Shout" by Tears for Fears, and; "Papa Don't Preach" by Madonna; with new music by "Weird Al" Yankovic
"Polka Power!"	Running with Scissors (1999)	A polka medley of...: "Wannabe" by the Spice Girls, "Flagpole Sitta" by Harvey Danger, "Ghetto Supastar (That Is What You Are)" by Pras, "Everybody (Backstreet's Back)" by the Backstreet Boys, "Walkin' on the Sun" by Smash Mouth, "Intergalactic" by the Beastie Boys, "Tubthumping" by Chumbawamba, "Ray of Light" by Madonna, "Push" by Matchbox Twenty, "Semi-Charmed Life" by Third Eye Blind, "The Dope Show" by Marilyn Manson, "MMMBop" by Hanson, "Sex and Candy" by Marcy Playground, and; "Closing Time" by Semisonic, with new music by "Weird Al" Yankovic
"Polka Your Eyes Out"	Off the Deep End (1992); Permanent Record: Al in the Box (1994)	A polka medley of...: "Cradle of Love" by Billy Idol, "Tom's Diner" by Suzanne Vega, "Love Shack" by The B-52's, "Pump Up the Jam" by Technotronic, "Losing My Religion" by R.E.M., "Unbelievable" by EMF, "Do Me!" by Bell Biv DeVoe, "Enter Sandman" by Metallica, "The Humpty Dance" by Digital Underground, "Cherry Pie" by Warrant, "Miss You Much" by Janet Jackson, "I Touch Myself" by Divinyls, "Dr. Feelgood" by Mötley Crüe, and; "Ice Ice Baby" by Vanilla Ice, with new music by "Weird Al" Yankovic
"Polkamania!"	Single (2024)	A polka medley of...: "Bad Guy" by Billie Eilish; "Hello" by Adele; "Flowers" by Miley Cyrus; "We Don't Talk About Bruno" by Lin-Manuel Miranda; "Vampire" by Olivia Rodrigo; "Old Town Road" by Lil Nas X; "Despacito" by Luis Fonsi featuring Daddy Yankee; "Shape of You" by Ed Sheeran; "Uptown Funk" by Mark Ronson featuring Bruno Mars; "WAP" by Cardi B featuring Megan Thee Stallion; "Thank U, Next" by Ariana Grande; "Shake It Off" by Taylor Swift, with new music by "Weird Al" Yankovic
"Polkarama!"	Straight Outta Lynwood (2006)	A polka medley of...: "The Chicken Dance" by Werner Thomas, "Let's Get It Started" by The Black Eyed Peas, "Take Me Out" by Franz Ferdinand, "Beverly Hills" by Weezer, "Speed of Sound" by Coldplay, "The Nina Bobina Polka" by "Weird Al" Yankovic, "Float On" by Modest Mouse, "Feel Good Inc." by Gorillaz feat. De La Soul, "Don't Cha" by the Pussycat Dolls feat. Busta Rhymes, "Somebody Told Me" by The Killers, "Slither" by Velvet Revolver, "Candy Shop" by 50 Cent feat. Olivia, "Drop It Like It's Hot" by Snoop Dogg feat. Pharrell, "Pon de Replay" by Rihanna, and; "Gold Digger" by Kanye West feat. Jamie Foxx, with new music by "Weird Al" Yankovic
"Polkas on 45"	"Weird Al" Yankovic in 3-D (1984); Permanent Record: Al in the Box (1994); The Essential "Weird Al" Yankovic (2009)	A polka medley, in the style of Stars on 45, of...: "Jocko Homo" by Devo, "Smoke on the Water" by Deep Purple, "Sex (I'm a ...)" by Berlin, "Hey Jude" by The Beatles, "L.A. Woman" by The Doors, "In-A-Gadda-Da-Vida" by Iron Butterfly, "Hey Joe" by The Jimi Hendrix Experience, "Burning Down the House" by Talking Heads, "Hot Blooded" by Foreigner, "Every Breath You Take" by The Police, "Should I Stay or Should I Go" by The Clash, "Jumpin' Jack Flash" by The Rolling Stones, and; "My Generation" by The Who; with new music by "Weird Al" Yankovic
"Poodle"	Peter and the Wolf (1988)	Original, part of "The Carnival of the Animals – Part Two", inspired by "The Carnival of the Animals" by Camille Saint-Saëns
"Pretty Fly for a Rabbi"	Running with Scissors (1999)	Parody of "Pretty Fly (for a White Guy)" by The Offspring
"Ricky"	"Weird Al" Yankovic (1983) "Weird Al" Yankovic's Greatest Hits (1988); Permanent Record: Al in the Box (1994); The TV Album (1995)	Parody of "Mickey" by Toni Basil. Lyrics and video pay homage to I Love Lucy. Tress MacNeille, of Animaniacs & The Simpsons fame, provides the voice of Lucy on the song (and also plays her in the video).
"Ringtone"	Internet Leaks digital EP (2009); Alpocalypse (2011)	Original, in the style of Queen.
"The Saga Begins"	Running with Scissors (1999); The Essential "Weird Al" Yankovic (2009)	Parody of "American Pie" by Don McLean. Lyrics recount the plot of Star Wars: Episode I – The Phantom Menace as told from the point of view of Obi-Wan Kenobi.
"Shark"	Peter and the Wolf (1988)	Original, part of "The Carnival of the Animals – Part Two", inspired by "The Carnival of the Animals" by Camille Saint-Saëns
"She Drives Like Crazy"	UHF – Original Motion Picture Soundtrack and Other Stuff (1989)	Parody of "She Drives Me Crazy" by Fine Young Cannibals
"She Never Told Me She Was a Mime"	Alapalooza (1993)	Original, in the style of KISS.
"Since You've Been Gone"	Bad Hair Day (1996); The Essential "Weird Al" Yankovic (2009); Medium Rarities (Karaoke version)	Original, in the style of a capella
"Sir Isaac Newton vs. Bill Nye"	Medium Rarities (2017)	Original. From Epic Rap Battles of History; feat. Peter "Nice Peter" Shukoff and Charles "Chali 2na" Stewart
"Skipper Dan"	Internet Leaks digital EP (2009); Alpocalypse (2011)	Original, in the style of Weezer. Based on the Jungle Cruise, an attraction in Adventureland in the Disney theme parks.
"Slime Creatures from Outer Space"	Dare to Be Stupid (1985)	Original, in the style of Thomas Dolby, particularly of the song "Hyperactive!"
"Smells Like Nirvana"	Off the Deep End (1992); Permanent Record: Al in the Box (1994); Greatest Hits Volume II (1994); The Essential "Weird Al" Yankovic (2009)	Parody of "Smells Like Teen Spirit" by Nirvana. The video was shot on the same sound stage as the original, and featured the original janitor and many of the original extras.
"Snails"	Peter and the Wolf (1988)	Original, part of "The Carnival of the Animals – Part Two", inspired by "The Carnival of the Animals" by Camille Saint-Saëns
"Spam"	UHF – Original Motion Picture Soundtrack and Other Stuff (1989); The Food Album (1993); Permanent Record: Al in the Box (1994)	Parody of "Stand" by R.E.M.
"Spatula City"	UHF - Original Motion Picture Soundtrack and Other Stuff (1989)	Excerpt from UHF
"Sports Song"	Mandatory Fun (2014)	Original, in the style of college football fight songs
"Spy Hard"	Medium Rarities (2017)	Original, in the style of James Bond opening themes composed by John Barry, especially Thunderball and Goldfinger. Also a single from the Spy Hard Soundtrack, and a bonus track on the "Gump" single
"Stop Draggin' My Car Around"	"Weird Al" Yankovic (1983)	Parody of "Stop Draggin' My Heart Around" by Stevie Nicks with Tom Petty and the Heartbreakers
"Stop Forwarding That Crap to Me"	Alpocalypse (2011)	Original, in the style of the work of Jim Steinman. Notably similar to "I'd Do Anything for Love (But I Won't Do That)" and "Objects in the Rear View Mirror May Appear Closer than They Are" as performed by Meat Loaf.
"Stuck in a Closet with Vanna White"	Even Worse (1988)	Original, in the style of Van Halen
"Such a Groovy Guy"	"Weird Al" Yankovic (1983)	Original
"Super Duper Party Pony"	Medium Rarities (2017)	Original. From the episode "Pinkie Pride" of My Little Pony: Friendship Is Magic.
"Syndicated Inc."	Bad Hair Day (1996)	Parody of "Misery" by Soul Asylum
"Tacky"	Mandatory Fun (2014)	Parody of "Happy" by Pharrell Williams
"Taco Grande"	Off the Deep End (1992); The Best of Yankovic (1992); The Food Album (1993); Permanent Record: Al in the Box (1994)	Parody of "Rico Suave" by Gerardo. Features guest appearance by Cheech Marin.
"Take Me Down"	Medium Rarities (2017)	Original. Also available on SLO Grown, SLO Unplugged II & Dr. Demento's Basement Tapes No. 8.
"Talk Soup"	Alapalooza (1993)	Original, in the style of Peter Gabriel, particularly "Steam" with the hook from Stevie Wonder's hit "Superstition"
"That Boy Could Dance"	"Weird Al" Yankovic in 3-D (1984)	Original, in the style of The Doobie Brothers' "China Grove".
"Theme from Rocky XIII (The Rye or the Kaiser)"	"Weird Al" Yankovic in 3-D (1984); The Food Album (1993) (also known as "The Rye or the Kaiser (Theme from Rocky XIII)")	Parody of "Eye of the Tiger" by Survivor
"This Is the Life"	Dare to Be Stupid (1985); Permanent Record: Al in the Box (1994)	Original, in the style of late 1920s through early 1930s jazz. Commissioned for the movie Johnny Dangerously.
"(This Song's Just) Six Words Long"	Even Worse (1988)	Parody of "Got My Mind Set on You" as performed by George Harrison, originally by James Ray (written by Rudy Clark).
"TMZ"	Alpocalypse (2011)	Parody of "You Belong with Me" by Taylor Swift
"Toothless People"	Polka Party! (1986)	Parody of Mick Jagger's eponymous song for the film Ruthless People
"Traffic Jam"	Alapalooza (1993)	Original, in the style of "Let's Go Crazy" by Prince and the Revolution.
"Trapped in the Drive-Thru"	Straight Outta Lynwood (2006); The Essential "Weird Al" Yankovic (2009)	Parody of "Trapped in the Closet" by R. Kelly. Contains an interpolation of "Black Dog" by Led Zeppelin.
"Trash Day"	Poodle Hat (2003)	Parody of "Hot in Herre" by Nelly
"Trigger Happy"	Off the Deep End (1992); Permanent Record: Al in the Box (1994); The Essential "Weird Al" Yankovic (2009)	Original, in the style of The Beach Boys and Jan and Dean.
"Truck Drivin' Song"	Running with Scissors (1999)	Original, in the style of Dave Dudley and C.W. McCall.
"Twister"	Even Worse (1988)	Original, in the style of the Beastie Boys. Based upon a television commercial for the titular Milton-Bradley game.
"UHF" (Album version)	UHF - Original Motion Picture Soundtrack and Other Stuff (1989); The TV Album	Original
"UHF" (Single version)	Permanent Record: Al in the Box (1994); Greatest Hits Volume II (1994); The Essential "Weird Al" Yankovic (2009)	Original
"Unicorn"	Peter and the Wolf (1988)	Original, part of "The Carnival of the Animals – Part Two", inspired by "The Carnival of the Animals" by Camille Saint-Saëns
"Velvet Elvis"	Even Worse (1988)	Original, in the style of The Police
"Virus Alert"	Straight Outta Lynwood (2006)	Original, in the style of Sparks
"Vulture"	Peter and the Wolf (1988)	Original, part of "The Carnival of the Animals – Part Two", inspired by "The Carnival of the Animals" by Camille Saint-Saëns
"Waffle King"	Alapalooza (1993)	Original, in the style of Peter Gabriel (especially "Sledgehammer")
"Wanna B Ur Lovr"	Poodle Hat (2003)	Original, in the style of Midnite Vultures-era Beck and Prince. Title is a play on Prince's tendency to omit vowels from song titles and takes from an actual song from his self-titled album.
"Weasel Stomping Day"	Straight Outta Lynwood (2006)	Original, in the style of "Trim up the Tree" by Albert Hague, from How the Grinch Stole Christmas!. The video was featured on an episode of the Adult Swim television series Robot Chicken.
"The Weird Al Show Theme"	The Weird Al Show (1997); Running with Scissors (1999)	Original
"What Is Life"	George Fest (2016)	originally by George Harrison
"Whatever You Like"	Internet Leaks digital EP (2008); Alpocalypse (2011)	Parody of "Whatever You Like" by T.I.
"When I Was Your Age"	Off the Deep End (1992); Permanent Record: Al in the Box (1994)	Original, in the style of "Dirty Laundry" by Don Henley
"White & Nerdy"	Straight Outta Lynwood (2006); The Essential "Weird Al" Yankovic (2009)	Parody of "Ridin'" by Chamillionaire feat. Krayzie Bone
"The White Stuff"	Off the Deep End (1992); The Food Album (1993)	Parody of "You Got It (The Right Stuff)" by New Kids on the Block. Describes Oreos.
"Why Does This Always Happen to Me?"	Poodle Hat (2003)	Original, in the style of Ben Folds, who also plays piano.
"Word Crimes"	Mandatory Fun (2014)	Parody of "Blurred Lines" by Robin Thicke featuring T.I. and Pharrell Williams
"Yoda"	Dare to Be Stupid (1985); Permanent Record: Al in the Box (1994); Greatest Hits Volume II (1994); The Essential "Weird Al" Yankovic (2009); Medium Rarities (Demo)	Parody of "Lola" by The Kinks. Lyrics recap the plot of The Empire Strikes Back as told from the point of view of Luke Skywalker.
"You Don't Love Me Anymore"	Off the Deep End (1992); Permanent Record: Al in the Box (1994); The Essential "Weird Al" Yankovic (2009)	Original, in the style of Nicolette Larson; the video is inspired by the video for "More Than Words" by Extreme.
"You Make Me"	Even Worse (1988); Permanent Record: Al in the Box (1994)	Original, in the style of Oingo Boingo, particularly "Grey Matter".
"Young, Dumb & Ugly"	Alapalooza (1993)	Original, in the style of AC/DC
"Your Horoscope for Today"	Running with Scissors (1999); The Essential "Weird Al" Yankovic (2009)	Original, in the style of third-wave ska and Reel Big Fish.

== Other commercially available songs ==
Song	Year	Available	Notes
"School Cafeteria"	1979	"My Bologna" 7"	A different, live in the studio version recorded the same year is on Dr. Demento's Basement Tapes No. 7
"Baby Likes Burping"	1980	Dr. Demento's Basement Tapes No. 11	Parody of "Baby Talks Dirty" by The Knack
"You Don't Take Your Showers"	1980	Dr. Demento's Basement Tapes No. 14	Parody of "You Don't Bring Me Flowers" by Barbra Streisand & Neil Diamond
"It's Still Billy Joel To Me"	1984	Dr. Demento's Basement Tapes No. 5	Live recording of a parody of "It's Still Rock & Roll to Me" by Billy Joel
"Babalu Music"	1991	Babalu Music!	
"Who Stole the Kishka?"	1995	Songs of the Polka King, Vol. 1	Performed with Frankie Yankovic
"Polkamon"	2000	Pokémon: The Movie 2000 soundtrack	
"I Need a Nap"	2005	Dog Train by Sandra Boynton	Duet with Kate Winslet
"You're Pitiful"	2006	Non-Album Single	Parody of "You're Beautiful" by James Blunt
"True Player for Real"	2009	This Gigantic Robot Kills	collaboration with MC Lars
"Circus Parade"	2010	Yo Gabba Gabba! Music Is Awesome 3	From the "Circus" episode of Yo Gabba Gabba!
"Daisy Bell (Bicycle Built for Two)"	2013	The Gay Nineties Old Tyme Music: Daisy Bell	
"If I Could Be Weird Al"	2011	The FuMP Volume 27	Cameo appearance on comedy song based off Yankovic, with spoken outro directly from him.
"F**k You"	2011	Garfunkel and Oates	Live recording released on YouTube
"Cheese Confesses"	2014	Pinkie Pie's Party Playlist	Includes "Pinkie the Party Planner (reprise)"; from the My Little Pony: Friendship is Magic episode "Pinkie Pride". Credited as "Cheese Sandwich"
"The Goof Off"	2014	Pinkie Pie's Party Playlist	From the My Little Pony: Friendship is Magic episode "Pinkie Pride". Credited as "Cheese Sandwich".
"Captain Underpants Theme Song"	2017	Captain Underpants: The First Epic Movie soundtrack	
"Robot Dance"	2017	Hog Wild by Sandra Boynton	Duet with Laura Linney
"The Hamilton Polka"	2018	digital single	Released in a series of Lin-Manuel Miranda's "Hamildrops"
Live in the Moment ("Weird Al" Remix)	2018	Digital Single	A Polka remix of Live in the Moment by Portugal the Man
"Who's Gonna Stop Me"	2020	digital single	Guest vocals on this Portugal. The Man single
"Scarif Beach Party"	2022	"Lego Star Wars: Summer Vacation"	
"Now You Know"	2022	Weird: The Al Yankovic Story	

== Songs from The Weird Al Show ==
Some episodes of The Weird Al Show contained songs that were not released on studio albums.

- Water Is Wet (as Fred Huggins)
- I Like You (as Fred Huggins)
- Cheese Is Good
- Camp Super Fun
- The Al's Mailbag Theme Song
- Who's At The Door
- Hey, Tahj Mowry
- What's With The Singing
- Why Don't We Show A Clip
- Why Did You Come
- I Made You Into A Freak
- I Quit
- It's Nice To Be Nice (as Fred Huggins)
- I'm A Little Kitty (as Fred Huggins)

== Songs not commercially released ==
This is a list of songs Yankovic has written and/or performed, but have not been commercially released.

- "12th Street Rag"
- "1999", originally by Prince
- "63,524 Bottles of Beer on the Wall"
- "Aaaaahhhhh"
- "Accordion Burning"
- "Accordion Tuning"
- "Addams Family Theme"
- "Albuquerque" (special "fake" version)
- "Al-In-The-Box"
- "Al's Mailbag Accordion Fanfare"
- "Al's Rug Song"
- "The Airport Song"
- "A Matter of Crust", a parody of "A Matter of Trust" by Billy Joel
- "AMA Squeeze"
- "The Amanda Polka", from Extreme Makeover: Home Edition
- "American Slob"
- "American Slob" (Hollywood Offramp Version)
- "Amish Paradise" (Unplugged Version)
- "Anniversary Song" (Dr. Demento's 15th Anniversary Special) by "Weird Al" and Barnes & Barnes
- "Another One Bites the Dust", originally by Queen
- "Aqualung", originally by Jethro Tull
- "Audience Inspiration Song"
- "Auld Lang Syne"
- "Auld Lang Syne" (Drunk Version)
- "Avocado", parody of "Desperado" by The Eagles
- "Babe"
- "Bad Hombres, Nasty Women", a 'songification' of the October 19, 2016 presidential debate by The Gregory Brothers
- "The Ballad of Kent Marlowe", from the ABC telefilm Safety Patrol
- "Belvedere Cruisin'"
- "Beverly Hillbillies/Miss You", a parody of "Miss You" by the Rolling Stones
- "Brain Freeze", from The Simpsons episode "That '90s Show", originally aired in April 2008. A parody of the fictional song "Shave Me" by Sadgasm, Homer Simpson's grunge band in the episode, "Shave Me" being a spin on "Rape Me" by Nirvana.
- "Burger King", a parody of "Sister Christian" by Night Ranger
- "Broken Knapsack", featured on the 30 Rock episode "Kidnapped by Danger"
- "Chicken Pot Pie", a parody of "Live and Let Die", originally written by Paul McCartney & Wings and re-recorded by Guns N' Roses
- "China Grove", originally by The Doobie Brothers
- "Close To You"
- "Comic Relief Rap" – Comic Relief, duet with Richard Belzer
- "Crusin' Down Higuera", a 1979 rework of Belvedere Cruisin'
- "Conan", the theme song to Conan (Performed on June 30, 2011)
- "Deja Vu (But Worse)", a songification of the 2024 presidential campaign with The Gregory Brothers
- "Doctor Doctor", a parody of "Doctor! Doctor!" by the Thompson Twins
- "Don't You Forget About Meat", a parody of "Don't You (Forget About Me)" by Simple Minds
- "Dueling Accordions"
- "Electric Shaver", from Sabrina: The Animated Series
- "Fast Food", a parody of "Thank U" by Alanis Morissette
- "Fatter", a parody of "Shattered" by The Rolling Stones
- "Feel Like Throwing Up", a parody of "Feel Like Making Love" by Bad Company
- "Flatbush Avenue", a parody of "Electric Avenue" by Eddy Grant
- "Free Delivery", a parody of "My Heart Will Go On", originally written by James Horner and originally performed by Celine Dion
- "Gee I'm A Nerd", a parody of "Free as a Bird" by The Beatles
- "Gravy on You", a parody of "Crazy on You" by Heart
- "Green Eggs & Ham", a parody of "Numb" by U2
- "Hot Beets", a parody of "Heartbeat" by Don Johnson
- "House of the Sesame Seed Bun", a parody of "House of the Rising Sun" by The Animals
- "Heart So Proud", featured on the 30 Rock episode "Kidnapped by Danger"
- "Hey Food" a parody of "Hey Jude"
- "If I Could Make Love to a Bottle", a parody of "Time in a Bottle" by Jim Croce
- "I'll Repair for You (Theme From Home Improvement)", a parody of "I'll Be There For You" by The Rembrandts
- "I'm in Love with the Skipper", parody of "I'm N Luv (Wit A Stripper)" by T-Pain
- "I'm Stupid Blues"
- "In-A-Gadda-Da-Vida", originally by Iron Butterfly
- "It's A Gas"
- "The Last Laugh", from My Little Pony: Friendship is Magic, episode "The Last Laugh", originally aired in August 2019
- "Last Train to Clarksville", originally by The Monkees
- "Laundry Day", a parody of "Come Out And Play" by The Offspring
- "Love Me Two Times", originally by The Doors
- "Make Me Steak #3", a parody of "Mistake #3" by Boy George and Culture Club
- "Minstrel Ditties" – Lilo & Stitch: The Series (Season 1, episode 15 "Tank")
- "Moldy Now", a parody of "Hold Me Now" by the Thompson Twins
- "More Than A Filling", a parody of "More Than a Feeling" by Boston
- "Mr. Frump in the Iron Lung" (Demo Version A)
- "Never Met A Person As Wonderful As Me"
- "Nobody But Me" by The Isley Brothers
- "Nobody Here But Us Frogs"
- "The North Korea Polka (Please Don't Nuke Us)", performed on an episode of Last Week Tonight with John Oliver that highlighted tensions between North Korea and the United States, which aired on 13 August 2017.
- "Orgy on My Own"
- "Ode To Joe Franklin"
- "Peaches", originally by The Presidents of the United States of America
- "Polka Patterns", written for the math TV show Square One
- "Purple Haze", originally by Jimi Hendrix
- "Rabbitage", a parody of "Sabotage" by Beastie Boys, featured on the American Dad! episode "First, Do No Farm"
- "Radio Radio", originally by Elvis Costello
- "Rio Rancho"
- "Rocky Road Hoochie Koo", a parody of "Rock & Roll Hoochie Koo" by Rick Derringer, who also produced Yankovic's first six albums
- "Rubber Sole"
- "School's Out", originally by Alice Cooper
- "Snack All Night", a parody of "Black or White" by Michael Jackson
- "Shaving Cream" (with Dr. Demento)
- "Smoke on the Water", originally by Deep Purple
- "Sometimes You Feel Like A Nut", a parody of "Suddenly Last Summer" by The Motels
- "Spameater", a parody of "Maneater" by Hall & Oates
- Spongetom Shortpants Theme, Parody of The SpongeBob SquarePants Theme, Appeared in Season 16 Episode 1 of SpongeBob SquarePants, but has not been released on DVD.
- "Squeeze Box" by The Who
- "Stop Draggin' My Car Around" (Demo Version C)
- "Sweet Home Alabama", originally by Lynyrd Skynyrd
- "Sweet Home Albuquerque"
- "Take Me to the Liver", a parody of "Take Me to the River" by Al Green, as performed by Talking Heads
- "Take The L Out of Liver", a parody of "Take The L Out of Lover" by The Motels
- "There's No Bathroom", written by Rachel Bloom, Jack Dolen, Adam Schlesinger and Dan Gregor; performed by Yankovic on Crazy Ex-Girlfriend
- "Toyland Song", A song Al made for a television ad, centered around Radio Shack's Toyland section of their store. The song has never gotten a physical release.
- "We All Have Cell Phones, So C'mon Let's Get Real", an original based on a fake 1999 AL-TV interview with Michael Stipe of R.E.M.
- "We Got The Beef", a parody of "We Got The Beat" by The Go-Go's
- "We're All Doomed", a 'songification' of the September 29, 2020 presidential debate by The Gregory Brothers
- "We Won't Eat Another Gyro", a parody of "We Don't Need Another Hero" by Tina Turner
- "Whole Lotta Lunch", a parody of "Whole Lotta Love" by Led Zeppelin
- "Whole Lotta Love", originally by Led Zeppelin
- "Who's It Gonna Be?", a songification of the 2020 presidential campaign with The Gregory Brothers
- "Wipeout"
- "Won't Eat Prunes Again", a parody of "Won't Get Fooled Again" by The Who
- "You're Pitiful", a parody of "You're Beautiful" by James Blunt, made available for free on June 8, 2006, at WeirdAl.com after objections from Atlantic Records, despite Yankovic receiving the approval of Blunt himself.
- "You Light Up My Life" (punk version)
- "(You Make Me Feel Like) A Natural Woman" by Aretha Franklin
- A polka medley performed at a 1982 Missing Persons concert including parts of "Jocko Homo", "Homosapien", "Sex Junkie", "T.V.O.D.", "Bad Boys Get Spanked", "TV Party", "Janitor", and "People Who Died"
- An extended version of "Polkas on 45" containing parts of "Der Kommissar", "1999", "Bad Boys Get Spanked", "She Blinded Me with Science", and "Stairway to Heaven"

== Misattribution and imitators ==
Yankovic's official website has the following note:

Unfortunately, there are a lot of song parodies floating around the Internet being attributed to Al which are in fact done by somebody else. "Star Wars Cantina", "Windows 95 Sucks", "Living La Vida Yoda", "Combo No. 5", "What If God Smoked Cannabis", "He Got The Wrong Foot Amputated" (the list goes on and on ... some of the titles are unprintable in a family-friendly web site) – these songs are NOT by Al. If you want to verify whether or not a song is actually by Al, check the Catalogue page.

Because Yankovic is arguably the most successful parody artist, songs posted to file sharing networks are often misattributed to him due to their humorous subject matter. Much to the disdain of Yankovic, this includes songs that are racist, sexually explicit, or otherwise offensive. A young listener who had heard several of these offensive tracks by way of a file sharing service confronted Yankovic online, threatening a boycott due to his supposedly explicit lyrics.

Yankovic cites these misattributions as "his real beef with P2P sites":

If you do a search for my name on any one of those sites, I guarantee you that about half of the songs that come up will be songs I had absolutely nothing to do with. That particularly bothers me, because I really try to do quality work, and I also try to maintain a more-or-less family-friendly image – and some of these songs that are supposedly by me are just ... well, vulgar and awful. I truly think my reputation has suffered in a lot of people's minds because of all those fake Weird Al songs floating around the Internet.

A list of songs not by Yankovic can be found at The Not Al List. Alternatively, a list of all commercially released songs recorded by Yankovic can be found on his website.

== See also ==
- "Weird Al" Yankovic
- "Weird Al" Yankovic discography
- List of singles by "Weird Al" Yankovic
- List of "Weird Al" Yankovic polka medleys
