= "Weird Al" Yankovic's Greatest Hits =

Greatest hits album by "Weird Al" Yankovic
- Released: October 18, 1988
- Recorded: 1983–1988
- Genres: Comedy pop; parody
- Length: 33:59
- Labels: Rock 'n Roll; Scotti Brothers

"Weird Al" Yankovic chronology
Peter & the Wolf (1988)	"Weird Al" Yankovic's Greatest Hits (1988)	UHF – Original Motion Picture Soundtrack and Other Stuff (1989)

"Weird Al" Yankovic's Greatest Hits is a compilation album of parody and original songs by "Weird Al" Yankovic, featuring his best known songs from his first five studio albums, all of which were released in the 1980s. "Weird Al" Yankovic's Greatest Hits was met with mostly positive reviews from critics, with Heather Phrase of AllMusic noting that it provided a good overview of the early part of Yankovic's career. Despite this, the album failed to chart upon release, and ranks as one of Yankovic's lowest-selling records.

== Production ==
=== Music ===
The music featured on the album span Yankovic's release in the 1980s, with the earliest songs being recorded in 1983, and the most recent song being recorded in 1988. Yankovic's 1983 debut album is represented solely by "Ricky". Both "Eat It" and "I Lost on Jeopardy" were taken from Yankovic's 1984 release "Weird Al" Yankovic in 3-D. Yankovic's third album, Dare to Be Stupid has three songs featured: "Like a Surgeon", the eponymous "Dare to Be Stupid", and "One More Minute". "Living with a Hernia" and "Addicted to Spuds" were culled from the 1986 album Polka Party!. Finally, Yankovic's then-recent studio album Even Worse is represented by "Fat" and "Lasagna".

== Reception ==
=== Critical response ===
Professional ratings
Review scores
Source	Rating
AllMusic	5/5 stars
The Encyclopedia of Popular Music	3/5 stars
The Rolling Stone Album Guide	3.5/5 stars

Heather Phares of AllMusic noted that, "though [the album] only covers the first half of "Weird Al" Yankovic's career, it nevertheless features nearly all of his best work". She highlighted "Eat It", "Fat", and "I Lost on Jeopardy" as the album's stand-out tracks, and concluded that the release "is still the most consistent and concise album in his catalog, and a great introduction to his very special brand of musical humor." Nathan Brackett and Christian Hoard, in The Rolling Stone Album Guide, awarded the album three-and-a-half stars out of five, denoting that the album averaged between good and excellent.

=== Commercial performance ===
The record was released on October 18, 1988, and upon its release failed to chart. As of January 1997, the album was one of Yankovic's least-selling records, although it ranked above several other albums such as Yankovic's second greatest hits compilation, The Food Album, the soundtrack album to his 1989 film UHF, The TV Album, and the Permanent Record box set in terms of sales.

== Track listing ==
1. "Fat" (orig. Michael Jackson, arr. Yankovic) – 3:37
  - Parody of "Bad" by Michael Jackson; the spoof discusses a man's obesity, which is blown out of proportion. From the 1988 album Even Worse.
2. "Eat It" (orig. Michael Jackson, arr. "Weird Al" Yankovic) – 3:21
  - Parody of "Beat It" by Michael Jackson; a song about a parent's exasperating quest to get their picky child to eat. From the 1984 album "Weird Al" Yankovic in 3-D.
3. "Like a Surgeon" (orig. Billy Steinberg, Tom Kelly, arr. Yankovic) – 3:32
  - Parody of "Like a Virgin" by Madonna; the song is about an incompetent surgeon performing surgery. From the 1985 album Dare to Be Stupid.
4. "Ricky" (orig. Mike Chapman, Nicky Chinn, arr. Yankovic) – 2:36
  - Parody of "Mickey" by Toni Basil; this is an ode to I Love Lucy with Yankovic playing the part of Ricky and Tress MacNeille as Lucy. From the 1983 album "Weird Al" Yankovic.
5. "Addicted to Spuds" (orig. Robert Palmer, arr. Yankovic) – 3:50
  - "Addicted to Love" by Robert Palmer; a song about a man's obsession for potatoes and potato-based dishes. From the 1986 album Polka Party!.
6. "Living with a Hernia" (orig. Dan Hartman, Charlie Midnight, arr. Yankovic) – 3:20
  - Parody of "Living in America" by James Brown; the song discusses various types of hernias. From the 1986 album Polka Party!.
7. "Dare to Be Stupid" (Yankovic) – 3:25
  - Style parody of Devo; the song recounts a list of "stupid" things a person can do. From the 1985 album Dare to Be Stupid.
8. "Lasagna" (arr. "Weird Al" Yankovic) – 2:46
  - Parody of the folk song "La Bamba"; a song centered largely around Italians and Italian cuisine. From the 1988 album Even Worse.
9. "I Lost on Jeopardy" (orig. Greg Kihn, Steve Wright, arr. Yankovic) – 3:28
  - Parody of "Jeopardy" by The Greg Kihn Band; a Jeopardy! contestant details why he lost. From the 1984 album "Weird Al" Yankovic in 3-D.
10. "One More Minute" (Yankovic) – 4:04
  - Style parody of Elvis Presley-like doo-wop; the song describes the myriad tortures that the singer would sooner endure than spending "one more minute" with his ex-girlfriend. From the 1985 album Dare to Be Stupid.

== Certifications ==
Certifications for "Weird Al" Yankovic's Greatest Hits
Region	Certification	Certified units/sales
Canada (Music Canada)	Gold	50,000^{^}
^{^} Shipments figures based on certification alone.

== See also ==
- Greatest Hits Volume II
