= Al TV =

American sketch comedy television series

- Also known as: "Weird Al" TV
- Genre: Comedy; Music
- Written by: "Weird Al" Yankovic
- Directed by: Jay Levey; Robert K. Weiss
- Presented by: "Weird Al" Yankovic
- No. of episodes: 10

Production
- Running time: 1–4 hours

Original release
- Network: MTV; VH1
- Release: April 1, 1984 – December 12, 2006

Al TV is an American sketch comedy television series created by and starring singer-songwriter "Weird Al" Yankovic that aired as periodic specials on MTV and VH1, beginning in 1984.

== Overview ==
The premise of the show is that Yankovic uses his private satellite transmitter to commandeer the airwaves of a music video station in order to show the videos that he wants to watch.

The program is primarily a parody of MTV itself, including that of MTV's Moon landing image sequence. As its theme music, the series featured a re-recording of MTV's own theme at the time, featuring Yankovic on accordion and manualist "Musical Mike" Kieffer. The show features commercials for imaginary products, fake interviews with celebrities, comments on the latest music news, letters from fans, and bizarre non sequiturs. For fake interviews, the show edits footage from unrelated outside interviews and manipulates it such that Al appears to be interviewing the celebrity in a silly or mocking way.

Al TV's main focus is music videos, especially his own, as well as others of an unusual or surreal comedy nature. As the series was conceived as a straight parody of the then-fledgling MTV network, early Al TV episodes featured music videos from popular artists of the time, including Peter Gabriel, David Bowie, and The Rolling Stones; these were eventually phased out. Al's own work consists of song parodies and "cover polkas", which essentially edit together the videos from the original artists with Al's music and vocals synchronized to the video segments. Al occasionally uses this tactic for certain song parodies for which no video was made.

Clips from Al TV, mainly fake interviews, are shown during costume changes in Yankovic's live shows. Yankovic's 1985 "documentary" The Compleat Al also included clips from Al TV.

== Episode list ==
Ten episodes have been produced, the first eight specials on MTV, the last two on VH1:

- Al TV #1 – In 3-D; April 1, 1984; four hours
- Al TV #2 – In 3-D; September 3, 1984; four hours
- Al TV #3 – Dare to Be Stupid; July 7, 1985; four hours
- Al TV #4 – Polka Party!; February 3, 1987; two hours
- Al TV #5 – Even Worse; April 20, 1988; two hours
- Al TV #6 – Off the Deep End; April 26, 1992; three hours, plus a one-hour sneak peek
- Al TV #7 – Bad Hair Day; May 23, 1996; two hours
- Al TV #8 (Al 2K) – Running with Scissors; December 4, 1999; two hours
- Al TV #9 – Poodle Hat; June 17, 2003; one hour
- Al TV #10 – Straight Outta Lynwood; December 15, 2006; one hour

In addition, Yankovic appeared as a guest VJ on MTV on February 22, 1984, using much the same format he would later use on Al TV.

== Canadian spinoff: Al Music ==
A similar installment of shows hosted by Yankovic were broadcast in Canada, under the name Al Music, which aired on Canada's MuchMusic network to concurrently promote the release of 3 of his albums in the 1990s. Similar to Al TV, Al Music also featured Yankovic commandeering the network broadcast, but this was achieved by visiting MuchMusic's studio unannounced, forcibly removing the scheduled VJ on-air & replacing them with himself in order to show the videos that he wanted to watch. He also incorporated the same parodying of the music station format through fake interviews with celebrities, comments on the latest music news, letters from fans, airing music videos strewn with Yankovic voice-overs making wisecracks and humorous observational comments about their content, and bizarre non-sequiturs that were incorporated in Al TV.

=== Episode list ===
- Al Music – Off the Deep End (removed VJ Steve Anthony); 1992
- Al Music 2 – Alapalooza (removed VJ Steve Anthony); 1993
- Al Music 3 – Bad Hair Day (removed VJ Bill Welychka); 1996

== See also ==
- Nerdist, hosting the series called Face to Face where Al conducts fake interviews in the style of Al TV.
