= The Food Album =

Compilation album by "Weird Al" Yankovic
- Released: June 22, 1993
- Recorded: 1982–92
- Genres: Comedy, pop
- Length: 30:57
- Labels: Rock 'n Roll Records; Scotti Brothers Records
- Producers: Rick Derringer, "Weird Al" Yankovic

"Weird Al" Yankovic chronology
| Off the Deep End (1992) | The Food Album (1993) | Alapalooza (1993) |

The Food Album is a compilation album by American singer-songwriter "Weird Al" Yankovic, released on June 22, 1993, by Scotti Brothers Records. The release features ten of Yankovic's song parodies, all of which pertain to food. A similar album, The TV Album, which features songs entirely about television, would be released two years later.

The album was begrudgingly released by Yankovic, who felt that the compilation was unnecessary and merely a way for his record label to make money. Several food-related songs that Yankovic had recorded, such as "Girls Just Want to Have Lunch" and "Waffle King", were left off the record, although the former was due to personal preference, while the latter was due to scheduling issues.

The Food Album received mixed reviews from music critics, many of whom felt that the record was an enjoyable collection of songs, but that it was not an essential record to purchase. Despite the lukewarm reception, the record was certified Gold by the Recording Industry Association of America (RIAA), making it Yankovic's first and only compilation record to reach this certification.

== Production ==
=== Music ===
The songs featured on The Food Album span a decade, with the earliest tracks dating from 1982 and the most recent from 1992. Two songs were taken from Yankovic's eponymous debut album: "I Love Rocky Road" and "My Bologna". Both "Eat It" and "Theme from Rocky XIII (The Rye or the Kaiser)" were taken from the 1984 release, "Weird Al" Yankovic in 3-D. "Addicted to Spuds" originally appeared on the 1986 release Polka Party!, and "Fat" and "Lasagna" were taken from Yankovic's 1988 release Even Worse. "Spam" was released on the soundtrack to the 1989 film UHF. The final two songs—"The White Stuff" and "Taco Grande"—were taken from the 1992 album Off the Deep End.

Notable for its absence is "Girls Just Want to Have Lunch", from Dare to Be Stupid (1985). According to Yankovic, this was due to a "royalty ceiling" on the album, which required that he pick one song to exclude from the release in order for it to be profitable. Yankovic chose to exclude "Girls Just Want to Have Lunch" because he disliked the song, as his record label had forced him to record it in order to release Dare to Be Stupid back in 1985. Also absent from the album is "Waffle King." The song had originally been recorded for Off the Deep End. However, Yankovic decided to swap "Waffle King" with "I Was Only Kidding"—a song he had actually recorded for his next album—at the last minute; this forced Yankovic to shelve "Waffle King" for the time being. The song was first released on "Smells Like Nirvana" single, as well as Yankovic's eighth studio album, Alapalooza, which was released four months after The Food Album.

=== Release ===
I don't mind putting out actual Greatest Hits albums every decade or so—I realize the value in that. I just have a problem when the record company tries to make a quick buck by putting out albums like Songs That Al Did In The Key Of F#.

— "Weird Al" Yankovic, discussing why he was displeased with The Food Album

The album was released by Scotti Brothers Records and was only begrudgingly approved by Yankovic. At the time, Scotti Brothers had insisted on putting out a new album by Yankovic in order to meet monetary projections at the time, despite the fact that no new album was ready (Alapalooza would not be released until later in the year). The label originally proposed a release entitled Al Unplugged, which would have featured studio remixes of previously released material, with the electronic instruments missing; the label also wanted the cover to feature Yankovic holding the cords of unplugged kitchen appliances. Yankovic did not enjoy this idea and convinced them to instead release The Food Album—"a concept [he] hated only slightly less"—but would later describe it as a "cheesy compilation" put out "against [his] better wishes and judgement."

The TV Album was released under similar circumstances in 1995; however, when it came time to release the latter album, Yankovic reported that "the record company was a whole lot nicer when they asked the second time", and that there was "more groveling [and] less demanding". Following the release of The Food Album and The TV Album—in addition to the various greatest hits records that had been released—Scotti Brothers used-up all of their compilation options in Yankovic's contract, which prevented the release of further compilations when Volcano Records acquired his contract in the late 1990s.

=== Artwork ===
The album artwork—which features a cartoon alien after it has eaten Yankovic—was created by Doug Lawrence, who is better known as "Mr. Lawrence", an American voice actor, comedian, writer, storyboard artist, animator and director. The "grotesque" cover was Yankovic's "passive-aggressive protest" against his label for forcing out the album; Yankovic intended the alien having "picked the desiccated corpse of Weird Al clean" to be a reference to his record label "bleed[ing] his catalogue dry" by releasing the album.

== Reception ==
=== Critical response ===
Professional ratings
Review scores
| Source | Rating |
|---|---|
| Allmusic | 3/5 stars |
| The Rolling Stone Album Guide | 3/5 stars |
| The Buffalo News | 3/5 stars |
| Press-Telegram | (Negative) |

The Food Album has received mixed reviews from most critics; many felt that while the album was amusing it was not an essential release. Allmusic reviewer Johnny Loftus awarded the album three out of five stars and wrote that, "The Food Album is an enjoyable bag of treats. Just don't eat too much, or you'll probably get sick." Likewise, The Rolling Stone Album Guide awarded the album three out of five stars. Anthony Violanti of The Buffalo News gave the album a moderately positive review and wrote that, "[t]here are two kinds of people in the world: those who love Weird Al Yankovic and those who can't stand him. Count me among the Weird One's biggest fans, and that's why I flipped out when listening to The Food Album." He concluded that the album was "like reading Mad magazine"; he gave the record three stars out of five. Tim Grobaty of the Press-Telegram, on the other hand, wrote negatively of the album, stating "Yankovic's songs are the kinds of things that are sort of funny in concept, less funny when you actually hear them once, and increasingly irritating with each subsequent listen [and] his food songs are among his worst."

=== Commercial performance ===
Upon release, The Food Album failed to chart; however, it sold steadily. On January 25, 2006—more than ten years after its release—the album was certified Gold by the Recording Industry Association of America (RIAA). This makes it Yankovic's first and only compilation album to sell over 500,000 copies and be certified Gold.

== Track listing ==
| Track | Title | Length | Parody of | Description | Original Album |
|---|---|---|---|---|---|
| 1 | "Fat" | 3:37 | "Bad" by Michael Jackson | About a man's obesity that is blown out of proportion. | Even Worse |
| 2 | "Lasagna" | 2:46 | "La Bamba" as performed by Los Lobos | A song centered largely around Italians and Italian cuisine. | Even Worse |
| 3 | "Addicted to Spuds" | 3:50 | "Addicted to Love" by Robert Palmer | About a man's obsession for potatoes and potato-based dishes. | Polka Party! |
| 4 | "I Love Rocky Road" | 2:36 | "I Love Rock 'n' Roll" as performed by Joan Jett | Narrator expresses his love towards the titular ice cream flavor. | "Weird Al" Yankovic |
| 5 | "Spam" | 3:23 | "Stand" by R.E.M. | About the canned luncheon meat Spam. | UHF - Original Motion Picture Soundtrack and Other Stuff |
| 6 | "Eat It" | 3:21 | "Beat It" by Michael Jackson | About a parent's exasperating quest to get their picky child to eat right. | "Weird Al" Yankovic in 3-D |
| 7 | "The White Stuff" | 2:43 | "You Got It (The Right Stuff)" by New Kids on the Block | A song wherein the singer expresses his love for the filling that appears between Oreo cookies. | Off the Deep End |
| 8 | "My Bologna" | 2:01 | "My Sharona" by The Knack | The narrator talks about his obsession with bologna sausage. | "Weird Al" Yankovic |
| 9 | "Taco Grande" | 3:44 | "Rico Suave" by Gerardo Mejía | About a narrator's visit to a fictional Mexican restaurant. Cheech Marin does a brief Spanish monologue in the song. | Off the Deep End |
| 10 | "The Rye or the Kaiser (Theme from Rocky XIII)" | 3:37 | "Eye of the Tiger" by Survivor. | About a washed-up Rocky Balboa, who now runs a deli and occasionally beats up on the liverwurst. | "Weird Al" Yankovic in 3-D |
| 11 | "Eat It (Karaoke Version)" | 3:21 | "Beat It", Michael Jackson | Karaoke version of "Eat It", included as a bonus track on the Japanese release. | The Official Music of "Weird Al" Yankovic |

== Certifications ==
| Country | Certification (sales thresholds) |
|---|---|
| United States | Gold |
