= The TV Album =

Compilation album by "Weird Al" Yankovic
- Released: November 7, 1995
- Recorded: 1983–1995
- Genre: Comedy
- Length: 39:52
- Label: Rock 'n Roll Records; Scotti Brothers
- Producer: "Weird Al" Yankovic, Rick Derringer

"Weird Al" Yankovic chronology
Greatest Hits Volume II (1994)	The TV Album (1995)	Bad Hair Day (1996)

Professional ratings
Review scores
Source	Rating
AllMusic	3.5/5 stars
The Rolling Stone Album Guide	2/5 stars

The TV Album is a compilation CD of songs by "Weird Al" Yankovic that features songs about television and TV shows. In 1993, Yankovic's former record label, Scotti Brothers, had released a similar album called The Food Album that contained songs about food. The artwork was done by Mad magazine veteran Jack Davis.

== Release ==
The album was released by Scotti Brothers Records and was only begrudgingly approved by Yankovic. At the time, Scotti Brothers had insisted on putting out a new album by Yankovic in order to meet monetary projections for the fiscal quarter, despite the fact that no new album was ready; Bad Hair Day would not be released until a year later. Scotti Brothers had previously released a similar compilation album in 1993 entitled The Food Album. However, when it came time to release The TV Album, Yankovic reported that "the record company was a whole lot nicer when they asked the second time", and that there was "more groveling [and] less demanding". Following the release of The Food Album and The TV Album—in addition to the various greatest hits records that had been released—Scotti Brothers used-up all of their compilation options in Yankovic's contract, which prevented the release of further compilations when Volcano Records acquired his contract in the late 1990s.

In Canada, it was released as The MuchMusic TV Album.

== Track listing ==
Track	Title	Length	(Style) Parody of	Description	Original Album
1	"Bedrock Anthem"	3:43	"Under the Bridge" and "Give It Away" by Red Hot Chili Peppers	Discusses someone who wants to be a Flintstone and live in Bedrock, describing the various perks in the delivery style of "Give it Away".	Alapalooza (1993)
2	"I Can't Watch This"	3:31	"U Can't Touch This" by MC Hammer	About a man who hates what he sees on TV.	Off the Deep End (1992)
3	"Frank's 2000" TV"	4:07	Style parody of R.E.M.'s early work	About someone whose neighbor got a big-screen TV with a display which measures 2000 inches diagonally.	Alapalooza
4	"Money for Nothing/Beverly Hillbillies"	3:14	"Money for Nothing" by Dire Straits	A song about The Beverly Hillbillies to the tune of "Money for Nothing" by Dire Straits. The TV Album lists the title without its asterisk.	UHF - Original Motion Picture Soundtrack and Other Stuff (1989)
5	"Ricky"	2:37	"Mickey" by Toni Basil	About I Love Lucy, discussing an argument between Lucy and Ricky Ricardo.	"Weird Al" Yankovic (1983)
6	"Talk Soup"	4:25	Style parody of Peter Gabriel's "Steam"	About a man who is desperate to appear on Geraldo, The Sally Jessy Raphael Show, or any other daytime talk show to talk about his bizarre relationships, uncommon family relations, and unusual opinions.	Alapalooza
7	"Here's Johnny"	3:25	"Who's Johnny" by El DeBarge	About The Tonight Show Starring Johnny Carson, and Ed McMahon's famous line, "Here's Johnny!"	Polka Party! (1986)
8	"The Brady Bunch"	2:41	"The Safety Dance" by Men Without Hats	About a man's dislike of the show The Brady Bunch.	"Weird Al" Yankovic in 3-D (1984)
9	"Cable TV"	3:38	Style parody of Elton John's "Hercules"	About a man's love of cable television.	Dare to Be Stupid (1985)
10	"I Lost on Jeopardy"	3:29	"Jeopardy" by the Greg Kihn Band	About a man who lost on Jeopardy!.	"Weird Al" Yankovic in 3-D
11	"UHF"	5:08	Original	About George's TV channel in UHF.	UHF - Original Motion Picture Soundtrack and Other Stuff
