= Jon "Bermuda" Schwartz =

American drummer (born 1956)

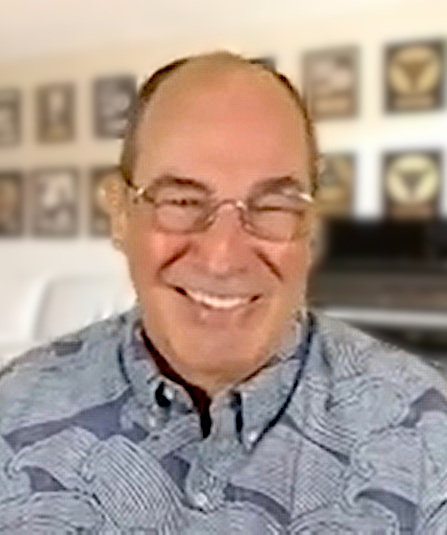
- Schwartz in 2021

Background information
- Also known as: Bermuda Schwartz; Jon "Bermuda" Schwartz
- Born: August 18, 1956 (age 70); Chicago, Illinois, U.S.
- Occupation: Drummer
- Member of: "Weird Al" Yankovic
- Website: bermudaschwartz.com

Jon "Bermuda" Schwartz (born August 18, 1956) is an American drummer best known for working with comedic musician "Weird Al" Yankovic. The two met while recording "Another One Rides the Bus" at the Dr. Demento show on September 14, 1980. Shortly after, Yankovic invited Schwartz to join his band, gave him the nickname "Bermuda" ("Bermuda Schwartz" being a play on the words "Bermuda shorts") and they have worked together ever since. Schwartz is heard and/or seen on all of Yankovic's albums, videos, and concerts.

== Early life ==
Although born in Chicago in 1956, Schwartz grew up in Phoenix. He came from a musical family; his father played accordion, his mother was a singer and piano player, and his brother, session guitarist and producer Richard Bennett, has recorded with countless top artists in Los Angeles and Nashville, and enjoyed lengthy associations touring and recording with Neil Diamond and Mark Knopfler.

Schwartz began drum lessons in 1965, and when his family moved to Los Angeles a few years later, he had decided to become a professional drummer and by the mid-1970s was drumming regularly with a few bands and doing some recording work.

== Later life ==
Schwartz first met "Weird Al" Yankovic at the Dr. Demento Show on KMET in Los Angeles, September 14, 1980. He has played drums for every "Weird Al" concert since 1981, except for three shows during the 2003 Poodle Hat Tour. A minor illness prevented him from playing the drums in 2003, when tour technician Pete Gallagher sat-in on the drums while Schwartz handled the electronics, cues, and vocals from behind the drum riser.

Schwartz is also the official band historian, known for keeping lists and notes, archiving a vast collection of retail, promo audio and video products from around the world featuring Yankovic as a performer, director, in a cameo appearance, or named or pictured on the product. Schwartz's large collection of photos, memorabilia, and other details on Yankovic is regularly sourced for rare and behind-the-scenes images or other materials.

In between Yankovic projects, Schwartz continues to play with other L.A.-area artists and bands and has worked with Rip Masters, Jim Silvers, Karling Abbeygate, Idle Hands, Ray Campi, Raymond and Scum, ApologetiX (specifically the album Biblical Graffiti, where he played drums on seven of the tracks), Lousy Little Gods, Brian Sisson, Crown City Bombers, and The Zero G Band.

Schwartz has enjoyed a respectable online presence since 1993. Schwartz began designing web sites in 1995, and grew it into a side-business that now includes other graphic design work such as CD layouts and book cover art. He also created the official "Weird Al" Yankovic website in 1995, which later became weirdal.com. He is an administrator for the World of "Weird Al" Yankovic and Drummerworld forums, and regularly participates in various forums with the username "bermuda".

In 2020, Jon became a published author with Black & White & Weird All Over, a coffee-table book featuring his unreleased black-and-white photographs of Weird Al from the early 1980s. He followed up with Lights, Camera, Accordion! in 2022, a collection of his color film photos of Weird Al from 1981 to 2006.

== Discography ==
| Album title | Release year |
|---|---|
| "Weird Al" Yankovic | 1983 |
| "Weird Al" Yankovic in 3-D | 1984 |
| Dare to Be Stupid | 1985 |
| Polka Party! | 1986 |
| Even Worse | 1988 |
| "Weird Al" Yankovic's Greatest Hits | 1988 |
| UHF - Original Motion Picture Soundtrack and Other Stuff | 1989 |
| Off the Deep End | 1992 |
| The Food Album | 1993 |
| Alapalooza | 1993 |
| Permanent Record: Al in the Box | 1994 |
| Greatest Hits Volume II | 1994 |
| The TV Album | 1995 |
| Bad Hair Day | 1996 |
| Running with Scissors | 1999 |
| Poodle Hat | 2003 |
| Straight Outta Lynwood | 2006 |
| Internet Leaks | 2009 |
| Alpocalypse | 2011 |
| Mandatory Fun | 2014 |

| Single | Release year |
|---|---|
| You're Pitiful^{1} | 2006 |
| Whatever You Like^{1} | 2008 |

^1The "You're Pitiful" and "Whatever You Like" singles were released as digital downloads only.
