= Face to Face with "Weird Al" Yankovic =

American YouTube comedy web series

Face to Face with "Weird Al" Yankovic was an American YouTube comedy web series hosted/written by comedian "Weird Al" Yankovic. It ran on the YouTube channel Nerdist, from early April to mid-August 2012. It was presented as a talk show. At the start of each episode, Yankovic would introduce the celebrity he interviewed that day. Usually, there would be two celebrity interviews per episode. The interviews featured footage from already-existing interviews with movie stars, with Yankovic edited into them, asking bizarre questions to comical answers from the celebrity. The celebrities he interviewed include Denzel Washington, Megan Fox, Uma Thurman, Nicolas Cage, Morgan Freeman, Jesse Eisenberg (mistaken as Michael Cera), Sylvester Stallone, Antonio Banderas, Patrick Stewart, Harrison Ford, Rose McGowan, Jeff Bridges, Robert Pattinson, Pierce Brosnan, Julianne Moore, Josh Brolin, and William H. Macy.

== Background ==
On 30 March 2012, "Weird Al" Yankovic uploaded a short video on the YouTube channel Nerdist, titled "Weird Al" Yankovic Talks Face To Face. In the video, he announced on 3 April 2012, he would begin weekly posting "in-depth, hard-hitting interviews with some of the biggest names in the entertainment industry". The series began on 3 April 2012 and ended on 14 August 2012.

== See also ==
- AL-TV, a series of MTV specials (also hosted by Yankovic)
- The Weird Al Show, a children's show hosted by Yankovic
