= Fat (song) =

1988 single by "Weird Al" Yankovic

Single by "Weird Al" Yankovic

from the album Even Worse
- B-side: "You Make Me"
- Released: April 12, 1988
- Recorded: February 18, 1988
- Genre: Comedy; pop rock
- Length: 3:36
- Label: Scotti Brothers
- Composer: Michael Jackson
- Lyricist: "Weird Al" Yankovic
- Producer: Rick Derringer

"Weird Al" Yankovic singles chronology
"Christmas at Ground Zero" (1986)	"Fat" (1988)	"Lasagna" (1988)

Music video
- "Fat" on YouTube

"Fat" is a song by "Weird Al" Yankovic. It is a parody of "Bad" by Michael Jackson and is Yankovic's second parody of a Jackson song, the first being "Eat It", a parody of Jackson's "Beat It". "Fat" is the first song on Yankovic's Even Worse album.

The video won a Grammy Award for Best Concept Music Video in 1988.

== Background ==
Yankovic was inspired to create "Fat" while watching the "Bad" music video, when he had an epiphany that a parody of that song titled "Fat" would be a good sequel to "Eat It" (a previous Weird Al Michael Jackson parody). While watching the "Bad" video, he imagined an obese version of himself trying to get through the turnstiles on a subway, and resolved to create the spoof.

== Concert version ==
When performing in concert, Yankovic wears a costume that makes his body appear obese, along with a mask that makes his face look so. Due to undergoing laser vision correction surgery, he no longer needs to wear glasses, though he wears glasses with non-prescription plastic lenses in order to help hold on the mask.

Yankovic elected not to perform the song or his other Jackson parody, "Eat It", during the Strings Attached Tour in the wake of the HBO documentary Leaving Neverland, in which two men claimed Jackson had sexually abused them when they were children. "I don't know if that's going to be permanent or not," Yankovic said of the decision. "But we just felt that with what's happened recently with the HBO documentaries, we didn't want anybody to feel uncomfortable.". He has since returned to performing the song live.

== Music video ==
Directed by Jay Levey, the video for "Fat" parodies various elements of the "Bad" video by Jackson; Yankovic was able to get permission from Michael Jackson to use the same subway set from "Bad" for the video, which had yet to be struck in Culver City. Jackson had built an exact replica of the original set for the movie Moonwalker to be used in the segment called "Badder", and before striking it, he offered to allow Yankovic to use it.

The fat suit was created by Camilla Henneman. The circumference of the suit was 111 inches (2,800 mm). The makeup was created by Kevin Yagher, who later worked with Yankovic on the film UHF. Latex bladders were glued to Yankovic's face, along with similar air pockets through his clothes.

== Personnel ==
According to the liner notes of The Essential "Weird Al" Yankovic:

- "Weird Al" Yankovic – lead and background vocals
- Jim West – guitars
- Jon "Bermuda" Schwartz – drums, tambourine, maracas
- Kim Bullard – synthesizer

== Chart performance ==
=== Weekly charts ===
Weekly chart performance for "Fat"
Chart (1988)	Peak position
Australia (ARIA)	12
Canada RPM Top Singles	80
New Zealand (Recorded Music NZ)	3
UK Singles (Official Charts)	80
US Billboard Hot 100	99
US Cashbox Top 100	89

=== Year-end charts ===
Year-end chart performance for "Fat"
Chart (1988)	Position
New Zealand (Recorded Music NZ)	49

== See also ==
- List of singles by "Weird Al" Yankovic
- List of songs by "Weird Al" Yankovic
