= Peter & the Wolf ("Weird Al" Yankovic and Wendy Carlos album) =

Studio album by "Weird Al" Yankovic and Wendy Carlos
- Released: October 4, 1988
- Recorded: September 1988
- Genre: Comedy
- Length: 57:57
- Label: CBS
- Producer: "Weird Al" Yankovic

"Weird Al" Yankovic chronology
Even Worse (1988)	Peter & the Wolf (1988)	"Weird Al" Yankovic's Greatest Hits (1988)

Wendy Carlos chronology
Secrets of Synthesis (1987)	Peter & the Wolf (1988)	Switched-On Bach 2000 (1992)

Peter & the Wolf/Carnival of the Animals – Part II is a studio album by American parody singer-songwriter and musician "Weird Al" Yankovic and composer and keyboardist Wendy Carlos, released in October 1988 on CBS Records. It features a comical adaptation of the orchestral works Peter and the Wolf by Sergei Prokofiev and The Carnival of the Animals by Camille Saint-Saëns.

== Accolades ==
The album was nominated for the Grammy Award for Best Album for Children at the 31st ceremony.

== Background ==
Wendy Carlos was invited by CBS Records to work on the project with Yankovic. She had greatly enjoyed the collaboration, later recounting that "the project was a chance for some musical fun and tomfoolery, working with a bright, witty collaborator, before getting back to more adventurous tuning and timbre projects." Carlos wrote new music for both stories.

== Tracks ==
"Peter and the Wolf" track reprises the original story, albeit with some humorous changes. The animals are named: Billy the Bird, Bruce the Duck, Louie the Cat, and Seymour the Wolf. There is also a new minor character; Bob the Janitor, represented musically by Yankovic's signature instrument, the accordion. After a long conflict between Peter and the wolf, Peter catches the wolf with dental floss. The moral of the story is "Oral hygiene is very important, make sure you see your dentist at least twice a year".

"The Carnival of the Animals – Part Two" is a parody of the Carnival of the Animals by Camille Saint-Saëns. The introduction explains: "Camille, in his research, was slightly behind, and I guess that some critters just plain slipped his mind, so to fill in this void in the Animal Kingdom, I'll read some new verses. I'm not gonna sing 'em."

== Release ==
On the LP and cassette releases, each side is one continuous track; the CD separates the parts of side 2. Like the majority of Wendy Carlos' discography, Peter and the Wolf hasn't been licensed for streaming services and the CD, LP, and cassette releases are all out of print and have become collector's items, all of which going for very high prices on both Amazon and eBay. While technically Yankovic's sixth studio album, it is not included as part of his main discography and the soundtrack to UHF is considered to be his official sixth studio album.

== Track listing ==
=== LP/Cassette ===
Side one
No.	Title	Length
1.	"Peter and the Wolf"	31:51

Side two
No.	Title	Length
2.	"The Carnival of the Animals – Part Two"	26:06
Total length:		57:57

=== CD ===
No.	Title	Length
1.	"(Peter and the Wolf) Introduction"	3:58
2.	"Peter and the Wolf"	27:52
3.	"Introduction (Carnival of the Animals - Part Two)"	1:20
4.	"Aardvark"	1:47
5.	"Hummingbirds"	0:58
6.	"Snails"	2:03
7.	"Alligator"	1:15
8.	"Amoeba"	1:52
9.	"Pigeons"	1:56
10.	"Shark"	2:17
11.	"Cockroaches"	1:40
12.	"Iguana"	0:35
13.	"Vulture"	3:14
14.	"Unicorn"	1:25
15.	"Poodle"	2:51
16.	"Finale"	2:53
