= I Lost on Jeopardy =

1984 single by "Weird Al" Yankovic

Single by "Weird Al" Yankovic

from the album "Weird Al" Yankovic in 3-D
- B-side: "I'll Be Mellow When I'm Dead" (7" version); "Mr. Popeil" (12" version)
- Released: June 4, 1984
- Recorded: December 12, 1983
- Genre: Comedy; power pop
- Length: 3:26
- Label: Scotti Brothers
- Songwriters: Original song by Greg Kihn, Steve Wright; parody lyrics by "Weird Al" Yankovic
- Producer: Rick Derringer

"Weird Al" Yankovic singles chronology
"King of Suede" (1984)	"I Lost on Jeopardy" (1984)	"This Is the Life" (1984)

Music video
- "I Lost on Jeopardy" on YouTube

"I Lost on Jeopardy" is a song by American musician "Weird Al" Yankovic from his second album, "Weird Al" Yankovic in 3-D, released in 1984. The song is a parody of "Jeopardy" by The Greg Kihn Band, released in 1983, and its refrain "Our love's in jeopardy". The parody's lyrics center on the game show Jeopardy!, and features a guest vocal from Don Pardo, who announced for Jeopardy! from 1964 to 1975. The music video uses a set inspired by the 1964-75 version of the game show, and in addition to Pardo, features cameos from the show's host Art Fleming as well as Dr. Demento and Greg Kihn. The song was released just prior to the revival of Jeopardy! in 1984, though contrary to popular theory, the revival was already in the works and was not inspired by Yankovic's song.

The song has appeared on several compilation albums, including "Weird Al" Yankovic's Greatest Hits (1988), Wacky Favorites (1993), and Permanent Record: Al in the Box (1994). The song charted at 83 on the Hot 100.

== Track listing ==
=== 7" single ===
1. "I Lost on Jeopardy" – 3:26
2. "I'll Be Mellow When I'm Dead" – 3:37

=== 12" promo single ===
1. "I Lost on Jeopardy" (extended mix) – 5:31
2. "Mr. Popeil" – 4:40

== Music video ==
=== Production ===
The video was directed by Jay Levey, and produced by Robert K. Weiss, and filmed on May 24 and 25, 1984. The video parodies the music video for "Jeopardy" and is filmed on a set based on the 1964–75 version of the quiz show Jeopardy!, and also depicts a "behind-the-scenes" look at the show; in addition to Pardo appearing on-camera, the video features cameo appearances by original Jeopardy! host Art Fleming, Yankovic's mentor, Dr. Demento, members of Yankovic's band, his real-life parents and a brief cameo by Greg Kihn at the end.

=== Synopsis ===
As the video begins, a nervous Yankovic finds himself pitted against a plumber and an architect, both of whom have Ph.D. diplomas that they show to him on stage. After host Art Fleming enters, he reveals the game board and its six categories: "T.V. Themes", "Nuclear Physics", "World Geography", "Food", "Potpourri", and "Famous Accordion Players", all of which contain a series of befuddling and nearly impossible answers. Although the other two contestants effortlessly give many correct responses during the game, Yankovic cannot and gives up instead.

Announcer Don Pardo proceeds to read from script and tell Yankovic what he did not win: a set of encyclopedias, a case of Turtle Wax, and a year's supply of Rice-A-Roni, but then Pardo throws the script away and tells Yankovic that he has disgraced himself to the audience and his family. Yankovic's podium begins to break down as his score continues to plummet in the negative column, while Pardo announces that he will not come back the next day, nor receive "a lousy copy of our home game", and that he is a "complete loser" as the camera zooms in on the game board, with the money cards replaced with cards reading "complete loser".

Fleming raspberries and gives two thumbs down to Yankovic, who rips off a piece of wood from his podium as two stagehands forcibly grab him and literally throw him out from the studio. Yankovic comments in his song's lyrics that he hopes he will do better "next weekend on The Price Is Right". At the end of the video, Yankovic lands in the back seat of an Alfa Romeo Spider convertible driven by Greg Kihn himself, with the license plate reading "LOSER".

=== References to Greg Kihn's "Jeopardy" video ===
- As two stagehands forcibly grab him to throw him out from the studio, Yankovic rips off a piece of wood from his podium. In the original "Jeopardy" video, Kihn tears up a piece of wood from one of the pews, where the monster pulled him into the center of the church.
- Yankovic lands in the back seat of an Alfa Romeo Spider convertible driven by Kihn himself, with the license plate reading "LOSER". In the original "Jeopardy" video, Kihn drives away from a wedding with a bride in an MG MGB convertible, with the license plate reading "LIPS". Kihn described his car as "a vintage sports car to approximate the one I drove in the original 'Jeopardy' video".

== Personnel ==
According to the liner notes of The Essential "Weird Al" Yankovic:

- "Weird Al" Yankovic – lead vocal and keyboards
- Jim West – guitar
- Steve Jay – bass guitar
- Jon "Bermuda" Schwartz – drums
- Don Pardo – announcer

== Chart positions ==
Chart (1984)	Peak Position
U.S. Billboard Hot 100	83

== Use on Jeopardy! ==
At the National Association of Television Program Executives convention in February 1984, Jeopardy! creator Merv Griffin announced that a revival version of that game show would be available, to be paired with the second syndicated season of Wheel of Fortune. The album where this song was featured was released shortly afterwards. It led to a gag on the June 29, 1984 episode of The Merv Griffin Show, where Griffin joked the success of the song meant his quiz show was returning. The gag on his talk show was made while the Jeopardy! revival was being sold to television stations during NATPE, before Yankovic's song was released to the public on an album or single or as a music video.

The song has been referenced several times on the new Jeopardy! itself, including once as a category (on June 26, 2009), and later when Yankovic appeared on Rock & Roll Jeopardy!. It was the subject of an Audio Daily Double on October 23, 1984, when the contestant who got the clue was asked to identify the artist of the song from an audio sample of the song but failed to do so; the subject of a Daily Double on the April 27, 2012 episode of the show, with the contestant receiving the clue, which consisted of the release year and some lyrics, but failing to identify the song; and the subject of a Daily Double on the March 15, 2018 episode of the show, in which the contestant receiving the clue—which consisted of a part of the lyrics—succeeded in identifying the singer.

On the August 13, 2021 episode, host Joe Buck (Note: After Ken Jennings' six-week run as host following Alex Trebek's death, interim hosts participated in one or two weeks of episodes; Buck was the last assigned interim host.) read the answer in "Lost" for $1,200: "Art Fleming and Don Pardo were in the video for this Weird Al parody song." Seventeen-day champion Matt Amodio correctly asked, "What's 'I Lost on Jeopardy!'?" Buck responded, "Yes, and don't sing it; it will not leave your head, it's been in mine for three weeks." During the Season 40 Second Chance Tournament that was part of the show's extended tournament break because of the 2023 Writers Guild of America strike, the September 29, 2023 episode featured "Weird Al Parodies" as a category. Jennings read the answer, "Encyclopedias and a case of Turtle Wax were among the prizes Al didn't win in this song & video that's near and dear to our hearts." Jilana Cotter asked the question, "What is 'I Lost on Jeopardy'?", leading to Jennings responding, "Yeah, that's the official Second Chance anthem."

== See also ==
- List of singles by "Weird Al" Yankovic
- List of songs by "Weird Al" Yankovic
