= Dare to Be Stupid =

1985 album by "Weird Al" Yankovic

Studio album by "Weird Al" Yankovic
- Released: June 18, 1985
- Recorded: August 20, 1984 – March 25, 1985
- Studios: Santa Monica Sound Recorders, Santa Monica
- Genres: Comedy; parody
- Length: 37:04
- Labels: Rock 'n Roll; Scotti Brothers
- Producer: Rick Derringer

"Weird Al" Yankovic chronology
| "Weird Al" Yankovic in 3-D (1984) | Dare to Be Stupid (1985) | Polka Party! (1986) |

Singles from Dare to Be Stupid
- 1. "This Is the Life" Released: November 1984; 2. "Like a Surgeon" Released: June 4, 1985; 3. "Hooked on Polkas" Released: June 18, 1985 (Japan only); 4. "I Want a New Duck" Released: July 1985; 5. "One More Minute" Released: August 1985; 6. "Dare to Be Stupid" Released: August 1986

Dare to Be Stupid is the third studio album by the American comedy musician "Weird Al" Yankovic, released on June 18, 1985. The album was one of many Yankovic records produced by former McCoys guitarist Rick Derringer. Recorded between August 1984 and March 1985, the album was Yankovic's first studio album released following the success of 1984's In 3-D, which included the Top 40 single "Eat It".

The music on Dare to Be Stupid is built around parodies and pastiches of pop and rock music of the mid-1980s, featuring reimaginings of Madonna, Cyndi Lauper, Huey Lewis and the News, and the Kinks. The album also features many "style parodies", or musical imitations that come close to, but do not copy, existing artists. These style parodies include imitations of Devo and Elvis Presley, as well as imitations of various musical genres such as doo-wop, sci-fi soundtracks, and music from the 1920s and 1930s.

Despite a mixed critical reception, Dare to Be Stupid sold well and peaked at number fifty on the Billboard 200. The album produced one of Yankovic's more famous singles, "Like a Surgeon", a parody of Madonna's "Like a Virgin"; the single peaked at number 47 on the Billboard Hot 100. The album was Yankovic's second Gold record and became certified Platinum for sales of over one million copies in the United States. The album was nominated for a Grammy Award for Best Comedy Recording in 1986.

== Production ==
=== Recording ===
In January 1985 Yankovic began the recording sessions for his In 3-D follow-up album. Rick Derringer, former guitarist for the McCoys, returned as producer. Backing Yankovic were Jon "Bermuda" Schwartz on drums, Steve Jay on bass, and Jim West on guitar. The first session yielded four originals: "Dare to Be Stupid", "Cable TV", "Slime Creatures from Outer Space", and "One More Minute". The band also recorded a cover of the theme from George of the Jungle. The following month, Yankovic began recording the album's four parodies and polka medley: "Yoda", "Like a Surgeon", "I Want a New Duck", "Girls Just Want to Have Lunch", and "Hooked on Polkas".

=== Originals ===
"This Is the Life", originally commissioned for the gangster spoof movie Johnny Dangerously and comically describing a gangster's lavish lifestyle, had already been recorded and released as a single in November 1984. The album's title track, "Dare to Be Stupid", is an ode to living life stupidly. According to the liner notes of The Ultimate Video Collection, the song represents "Al's motto in life". The song is a style parody of the band Devo, whose reaction to the pastiche was positive. Yankovic said "Right after I finished 'Dare to Be Stupid', I went over to Mark Mothersbaugh's house and played it for him. He seemed to enjoy it a lot." The song was later released on the soundtrack to the 1986 film The Transformers: The Movie, and Yankovic later mused that more people were introduced to the song by the movie than by his own album.

"One More Minute", about an ex-girlfriend, was written in the style of an Elvis Presley doo-wop song. According to the liner notes of Permanent Record, Yankovic was preparing to write songs for Dare to Be Stupid when his then-girlfriend broke up with him. In order to mentally deal with the heartbreak, Yankovic decided to write a humorous song to express his anger, eventually writing "One More Minute". Yankovic tears up her picture in the video. "Slime Creatures from Outer Space" features prominent usage of a theremin, courtesy of Steve Jay, in order to emulate the sound of "cheesy 50s sci-fi soundtracks."

=== Parodies and polka ===
"Yoda" (sample)
"Yoda", from Yankovic's 1985 album Dare to Be Stupid. The sample illustrates the chorus of Yankovic's parody, including the musical re-creation of the original Kinks song.

On February 21, 1985, Yankovic began recording the parodies for Dare to Be Stupid. The first parody recorded for the album was "Yoda". "Yoda" was originally written by Yankovic during the initial run of the 1980 American film The Empire Strikes Back. After the success of the movie, Yankovic toyed with the idea of writing a song based on the break-out character, but was unable to find a suitable song to use as the base. Yankovic remembers, "I was still in college at the time, and a friend of mine named Mike suggested that I do the song to the tune of 'Lola'—which I couldn't believe that I hadn't thought of myself, since I was such a huge Kinks fan." Yankovic wrote and recorded a version of the song, using only an accordion, on a four-track cassette Portastudio. This version of "Yoda" was a hit on The Dr. Demento Show, and even managed to hit, and hold onto, number one on the Funny Five countdown for several weeks. This early demo was later released on the sixth volume of Dr. Demento's Basement Tapes.

After the success of the demo version, Yankovic wanted to put the song on one of his albums. However, securing permission from George Lucas and the Kinks delayed the release of the song for about five years. Eventually, after Lucas gave Yankovic permission, the song's publishers turned Yankovic down. Several versions of why the parody was turned down exist. In a 1985 interview with Spin, Yankovic explained that, "We approached Ray Davies [the song's composer], we've been approaching him every year and a half, two years before each album comes out and he's always been a little skeptical, a little afraid because 'Lola' was a very personal song for him. Then just out of the blue he decided this time to let us do it." However, the liner notes to the Permanent Record present a different story. According to the album's notes, the song may have remained unreleased for some time had it not been for a chance encounter between Yankovic and Davies. When Yankovic asked why he hadn't given him permission, Davies remarked that he had never been asked. Davies immediately gave Yankovic permission to record the song, and the song was later released on Dare to Be Stupid.

"Like a Surgeon" (sample)
"Like a Surgeon", from Yankovic's 1985 album Dare to Be Stupid. The sample illustrates the chorus of Yankovic's parody, including the musical re-creation of the original Madonna song.

The day after recording "Yoda", Yankovic started recording "Like a Surgeon", the lead single for the album. Although Yankovic normally refuses to use parody ideas from other people, Madonna is partly responsible for "Like a Surgeon". Madonna asked one of her friends how long it would take until Yankovic satirized her song "Like a Virgin" into "Like a Surgeon". This friend was a mutual friend of Al's manager, Jay Levey. When word got back to Yankovic, he decided it was a good idea and wrote the song. This is the only known time that Yankovic has gotten a parody idea directly from the original artist.

The third parody recorded for the album was a parody of "I Want a New Drug" by Huey Lewis and the News entitled "I Want a New Duck". After the recording of "I Want a New Duck", Yankovic was comfortable with releasing the album as it was. However, Scotti Bros. insisted that Yankovic include a parody of a Cyndi Lauper song. Yankovic complied, producing "Girls Just Want to Have Lunch". However, because he was effectively forced to record the parody, Yankovic has cited "Girls Just Want to Have Lunch" as one of his least favorite songs, and ultimately left it off his 1993 compilation album The Food Album. Yankovic also approached Prince about a potential parody of "When Doves Cry", circa 1984. Prince refused, and did not accept any future parody ideas Yankovic presented to him.

On March 25, 1985, Yankovic rounded out the recording of his new album with a polka medley of then-popular songs in music. Dare to Be Stupid also includes "George of the Jungle", a cover of the theme song to the 1967 TV series. It was the first of only a few cover songs, not counting polka medleys, released by Yankovic. The song later appeared on the soundtrack to the 1997 film adaptation of George of the Jungle.

== Reception ==
=== Promotion ===
After the release of the album, Yankovic undertook the 70-city "Stupid Tour"; this was his biggest tour of the 1980s, and featured "costume changes, carefully designed lighting, and several of Al's videos cleverly integrated into the stage show". Yankovic's on-stage wardrobe changed dramatically during the tour, and he specifically stipulated that every promoter "had to supply one garish Hawaiian shirt" for him to wear. Yankovic eventually acquired "a couple closets full" of them. Yankovic also started wearing exclusively Vans, and joked that "whenever I need some they let me go to their warehouse and take home an armload."

The videos that were made to promote Dare to Be Stupid were later compiled, with additional material, into a direct-to-video mockumentary called The Compleat Al. This production, directed by Yankovic's manager Jay Levey and Robert K. Weiss, was one of "the first programs of its kind to be made specifically for the home video market". A 60-minute version was later aired on Showtime. To go along with the video, the tongue-in-cheek book The Authorized Al was also released. The book, co-written by Yankovic and Tino Insana, has since gone out of print.

=== Critical response ===
Professional ratings
Review scores
| Source | Rating |
|---|---|
| AllMusic | 3.5/5 stars |
| The Daily Vault | B− |
| Pitchfork | 6.5/10 |
| Rolling Stone | 3/5 stars |

Dare to Be Stupid received some moderately favorable reviews from critics. AllMusic reviewer Eugene Chadbourne awarded the album three and a half stars, and cited "Like a Surgeon" and "Dare to Be Stupid" as some of Yankovic's best songs. Christopher Thelen from The Daily Vault wrote that "while Dare To Be Stupid is not Yankovic's finest album [...] there's enough on this one to recommend it". The song "Yoda" has gone on to become one of Yankovic's most famous songs. Although it was left off his first greatest hits album, the song was featured on the second volume, the box set Permanent Record, and the 2009 compilation The Essential "Weird Al" Yankovic. The song appeared on "The Time Machine" episode of The Weird Al Show, and on the compilation album Radio Disney: Kid Jams.

Although the lead single "Like a Surgeon" and the parody "Yoda" were met with praise, many criticized the album's other parodies. Many critics were split on the amount of emphasis the original songs were given. Rolling Stone writer David Hinkley wrote positively that "the pick of this album's original litter is 'One More Minute', which is a parody of a style (Fifties vocal group) rather than a specific song and is a superb tune besides – right down to the perfect little gasp right before the final chorus". In contrast, Chadbourne was disappointed with the original material, stating that "only someone who is missing important brain cells would suggest this artist's original songs are any good". The album was nominated for a Grammy Award for Best Comedy Recording in 1986, though it lost to Whoopi Goldberg's Whoopi: Original Broadway Recording.

=== Commercial performance ===
Dare to Be Stupid was released on June 18, 1985; it was the first album of musical comedy to be released on compact disc. Dare to Be Stupid eventually peaked on the Billboard 200 at number 50. The album spent a total of eight weeks on the chart. On January 27, 1986, a little less than a year after its release, the album was certified Gold by the Recording Industry Association of America (RIAA). On February 24, 2003, the album was certified Platinum by the RIAA.

== Track listing ==
Side one
| No. | Title | Writer(s) | Parody of | Length |
|---|---|---|---|---|
| 1. | "Like a Surgeon" | William Steinberg, Thomas Kelly, Alfred Yankovic | "Like a Virgin" by Madonna | 3:32 |
| 2. | "Dare to Be Stupid" | Yankovic | Style parody of Devo | 3:25 |
| 3. | "I Want a New Duck" | Christopher Hayes, Hugh Cregg III, Yankovic | "I Want a New Drug" by Huey Lewis and the News | 3:04 |
| 4. | "One More Minute" | Yankovic | Style parody of Elvis Presley-like doo-wop | 4:04 |
| 5. | "Yoda" | Raymond Davies, Yankovic | "Lola" by the Kinks | 3:58 |

Side two
| No. | Title | Writer(s) | Parody of | Length |
|---|---|---|---|---|
| 6. | "George of the Jungle" | Stan Worth, Sheldon Allman | Cover of the George of the Jungle theme song | 1:05 |
| 7. | "Slime Creatures from Outer Space" | Yankovic | Style parody of 1950s sci-fi soundtracks and "Hyperactive!" by Thomas Dolby | 4:23 |
| 8. | "Girls Just Want to Have Lunch" | Robert Hazard, Yankovic | "Girls Just Want to Have Fun" by Cyndi Lauper | 2:48 |
| 9. | "This Is the Life" | Yankovic | Theme song of the film Johnny Dangerously. Style parody of 1920s and 1930s music | 3:06 |
| 10. | "Cable TV" | Yankovic | Style parody of "Hercules" by Elton John | 3:38 |
| 11. | "Hooked on Polkas" | Various | A polka medley including: "12th Street Rag" by Euday L. Bowman; "State of Shock" by the Jacksons and Mick Jagger; "Sharp Dressed Man" by ZZ Top; "What's Love Got to Do with It" by Tina Turner; "Method of Modern Love" by Hall & Oates; "Owner of a Lonely Heart" by Yes; "We're Not Gonna Take It" by Twisted Sister; "99 Luftballons" by Nena; "Footloose" by Kenny Loggins; "The Reflex" by Duran Duran; "Metal Health (Bang Your Head)" by Quiet Riot; "Relax" by Frankie Goes to Hollywood; "Ear Booker Polka" by "Weird Al" Yankovic | 3:53 |
| Total length: | | | | 37:04 |

== Personnel ==
Credits adapted from LP liner notes.

"The Stupid Band"

- "Weird Al" Yankovic – lead vocals, background vocals, accordion, keyboards, theremin
- Jim West – guitars, background vocals
- Steve Jay – bass guitar, banjo, background vocals
- Jon "Bermuda" Schwartz – drums, percussion

"Our Stupid Guests"

- Pat Regan – synthesizers, piano
- Sonny Burke – piano
- Rick Derringer – guitars
- The Waters Sisters – background vocals (track 10)
- Warren Luening – trumpet
- Jimmy Zavala – saxophone
- Gary Herbig – saxophone, clarinet
- Joel Peskin – clarinet
- Tommy Johnson – tuba
- Al Viola – banjo
- The Glove – scratching
- "Musical Mike" Kieffer – musical hands
- Bill Scott – George of the Jungle (track 6)

Technical

- Rick Derringer – producer
- "Weird Al" Yankovic – arranger
- Tony Papa – engineer (tracks 1–8, 10–11)
- George Tutko – engineer (track 9)
- Lane/Donald – art direction
- Dennis Keeley – photography
- Lou Beach – illustration

== Charts and certifications ==
=== Charts ===
| Chart | Peak position |
|---|---|
| US Billboard 200 | 50 |
| Can. RPM Top 100 | 55 |

=== Certifications ===
| Country | Certification (sales thresholds) |
|---|---|
| United States | Platinum |

=== Singles ===
| Year | Song | Peak positions | | |
| Year | Song | US 100 | AUS 100 | CAN 100 |
|---|---|---|---|---|
| 1985 | "Like a Surgeon" | 47 | 19 | 35 |
