= Eat It =

1984 single by "Weird Al" Yankovic

Single by "Weird Al" Yankovic

from the album "Weird Al" Yankovic in 3-D
- B-side: "That Boy Could Dance"
- Released: February 28, 1984
- Recorded: December 13, 1983
- Genre: Comedy rock; hard rock; parody
- Length: 3:19
- Label: Scotti Brothers
- Songwriters: Michael Jackson; "Weird Al" Yankovic
- Producer: Rick Derringer

"Weird Al" Yankovic singles chronology
"I Love Rocky Road" (1983)	"Eat It" (1984)	"King of Suede" (1984)

Alternative covers
- British single cover

- Japanese single cover

Music videos
- "Eat It" (original version) on YouTube
- "Eat It" (coverage take) on YouTube

"Eat It" is a 1984 song by American comedy music artist "Weird Al" Yankovic. It is a parody of Michael Jackson's 1983 single "Beat It", with the contents changed to be about an exasperated parent attempting to get their picky child to eat. The track was both a commercial and critical success, earning Yankovic a Grammy Award. It peaked at number twelve in the United States, making it his first top 40 hit in that country, and reached number one in Australia.

== Production ==
The famous guitar solo, performed by Eddie Van Halen on "Beat It", was reproduced by "Weird Al" Yankovic's producer, Rick Derringer.

According to Yankovic, Michael Jackson "not only returned our phone calls, but he approved it. He thought it was a funny idea." On October 19, 1989, the RIAA certified "Eat It" as a gold single.

== Reception ==
The single reached number 1 in Australia, and it was his highest-charting US single on the Billboard Hot 100 at number 12 until "White & Nerdy" peaked at number 9 in October 2006. "Eat It" earned Yankovic a 1984 Grammy Award in the Best Comedy Recording category. "Eat It" also outranked "Beat It" in overall highest position on the Australian singles chart, with its highest rank being number 1, while "Beat It"'s highest was third.

Cash Box reviewed the single, saying "Rick Derringer's production has remained true to the energy and appeal of Michael Jackson's original version, and the lyrics ... are actually very funny."

== Track listing ==
=== 1984 release ===
1. "Eat It" – 3:19
2. "That Boy Could Dance" – 3:32

=== 1985/1993 re-release ===
1. "Eat It" – 3:19
2. "I Lost on Jeopardy" – 3:26

== Music video ==
The video for "Eat It" is styled as a shot-for-shot remake of Jackson's video for "Beat It", but with elements being parodied in various silly ways and Yankovic dressed as Jackson. The video also features a few of the same dancers from Jackson's video and Yankovic clumsily mimicking the dance moves from the original video. The video ends with Yankovic looking into the camera with yellow cat-like eyes, referencing the end of Jackson's video for "Thriller". Jackson received royalties from Yankovic for rights to cover the video so closely.

On June 20, 2022, Yankovic uploaded an alternative version of the music video on his YouTube channel, which consists of a single "coverage take". The alternate take of Yankovic singing, dancing, and writhing on the bed in the bedroom was intended to be used as a backup if other shots were unusable or unable to be procured in time, although Yankovic said he believed none of the footage was used in the original 1984 cut.

The original 16mm footage of the video was digitized into 4K resolution and re-edited by Yankovic (during the 2022 The Unfortunate Return of the Ridiculously Self-Indulgent, Ill-Advised Vanity Tour) to recreate the original video frame-for-frame. This remaster was done for a scene in Weird: The Al Yankovic Story, which included a brief glimpse of the "Eat It" video with star Daniel Radcliffe's face digitally superimposed on Yankovic's.

== Legacy ==
In 2019, Yankovic had pulled "Eat It" and his other Jackson song parody, "Fat", from the setlist of his Strings Attached Tour in the wake of the HBO documentary Leaving Neverland, in which two men claimed Jackson had sexually abused them when they were children. "I don't know if that's going to be permanent or not", Yankovic said of the decision. "But we just felt that with what's happened recently with the HBO documentaries, we didn't want anybody to feel uncomfortable." Ultimately, Yankovic brought both songs back during his 2025 Bigger & Weirder tour.

As part of a charity effort during the COVID-19 pandemic, David Cross and Bob Odenkirk held a Mr. Show online reunion show in May 2020 with many of their former cast members as well as other friends. The show concluded by having Cross, Odenkirk and their cast, as well as Yankovic, sing "Eat It", in a purposely tone-deaf manner that parodied a prior cover performance of "Imagine" that Gal Gadot and other celebrities had done for COVID-19 awareness but which had been taken as ineffectual.

== Personnel ==
According to the liner notes of The Essential "Weird Al" Yankovic:

- "Weird Al" Yankovic – lead & background vocals
- Jim West – guitar
- Rick Derringer – guitar solo, producer
- Jon "Bermuda" Schwartz – drums
- Pat Regan – synthesizers
- "Musical Mike" Kieffer – hand music

== Charts ==
=== Weekly charts ===
Weekly chart performance
Chart (1984–1985)	Peak position
Australia (Kent Music Report)	1
Canada Top Singles (RPM)	5
Ireland (IRMA)	18
New Zealand (Recorded Music NZ)	6
UK Singles (Official Charts)	36
US Billboard Hot 100	12
US Hot R&B/Hip-Hop Songs (Billboard)	84
US Mainstream Rock (Billboard)	38
US Cashbox Top 100	4

=== Year-end charts ===
Year-end chart performance
Chart (1984)	Position
Australia (Kent Music Report)	57
Canada Top Singles (RPM)	55

== Certifications ==
Region	Certification	Certified units/sales
Canada (Music Canada)	Gold	50,000^{^}
United States (RIAA)	Gold	500,000^{^}
^{^} Shipments figures based on certification alone.

== See also ==
- List of singles by "Weird Al" Yankovic
- List of songs by "Weird Al" Yankovic
