= Even Worse =

1988 album by "Weird Al" Yankovic

Studio album by "Weird Al" Yankovic
- Released: April 12, 1988
- Recorded: November 30, 1987 – February 19, 1988
- Studios: Santa Monica Sound Recorders, Santa Monica
- Genres: Comedy; comedy rock; comedy pop
- Length: 37:32
- Labels: Rock 'n Roll; Scotti Brothers
- Producer: Rick Derringer

"Weird Al" Yankovic chronology
Polka Party! (1986)	Even Worse (1988)	Peter & the Wolf (1988)

Singles from Even Worse
- 1. "Fat" Released: April 12, 1988; 2. "Lasagna" Released: May 27, 1988; 3. "I Think I'm a Clone Now" Released: June 14, 1988

Even Worse is the fifth studio album by the American parody musician "Weird Al" Yankovic, released on April 12, 1988. The album was produced by former The McCoys guitarist Rick Derringer. Recorded between November 1987 and February 1988, this album helped to revitalize Yankovic's career after the critical and commercial failure of his previous album Polka Party! (1986).

The music on Even Worse is built around parodies and pastiches of pop and rock music of the late 1980s. Half of the album is made up of parodies, featuring jabs at Michael Jackson, George Harrison, Tiffany, Los Lobos, and Billy Idol. The other half is original material, featuring several "style parodies" or musical imitations that emulate existing artists. These style parodies include imitations of specific artists such as Oingo Boingo, Beastie Boys, and James Taylor. Even Worse has the distinction of being one of two albums by Yankovic lacking any polka renditions of pop songs or medleys, the other being his self-titled debut album from 1983. This album's title and cover art are spoofs of Michael Jackson's 1987 album Bad.

Even Worse was met with mostly positive reviews and peaked at No. 27 on the Billboard 200, becoming Yankovic's best-selling album. The album also produced one of Yankovic's hit singles, "Fat", a parody of Michael Jackson's "Bad", which peaked at No. 99 on the Billboard Hot 100 and became a staple on MTV. The album was certified as a gold record, and later as a platinum record with sales of over one million copies in the United States, becoming Yankovic's first platinum record. "Fat" won the Grammy Award for Best Concept Music Video.

== Production ==
=== Background and recording ===
After success in the early '80s, Yankovic released Polka Party! in 1986. Although featuring parodies of hit songs like "Living in America" and "Addicted to Love", the album was a critical and commercial failure. It did not yield a charting single and it peaked at number 177 on the Billboard 200. After the disappointment with Polka Party!, Yankovic went on record saying, "I thought it was the end of my career." For most of 1987, Yankovic took a break from recording.

=== Originals ===
Near the end of 1987, Yankovic returned to the studio to record the original songs that would eventually appear on Even Worse. Once again, former the McCoys guitarist Rick Derringer was brought in as producer. The album's originals were recorded in three sessions: During the first (which began on November 30, 1987), Yankovic started to record "Stuck in a Closet with Vanna White" and "Melanie"; during the second session (which began on December 1, 1987), he began working on "Good Old Days", "You Make Me", and "Velvet Elvis"; and during the final session (which began on February 18, 1988), Yankovic recorded "Twister".

"Stuck in a Closet with Vanna White" is an original glam rock song in which the singer recounts a bizarre recurring dream about Vanna White. AllMusic described the song as a "real winner for Yankovic" because it was one of the musician's first originals that "his [...] target audience [...] liked as much or even more than his parodies." "You Make Me" is a song involving a person's desire to engage in strange or violent behavior compelled by the weirdness of another person. According to the liner notes of The Permanent Record, "It's about as close as [Yankovic has] ever come to writing a real love song." Musically, the song is a style parody of Oingo Boingo.

"Melanie" is a stalker's twisted love song to his neighbor Melanie. According to Yankovic, he wrote several additional verses for "Melanie" that he would only sing to his friends. "Velvet Elvis" is written in the style of the Police, and is an ode to the kitschy type of titular painting. "Twister" is an ode to the Milton Bradley game Twister. The song is a style parody of Beastie Boys. When Yankovic was recording the song, he initially recorded about 20 vocal takes. However, when it came time to pick the right take, he opted for the first because it sounded "more raw and more off-the-cuff." The album's closer, "Good Old Days" is about a psychopath fondly remembering his childhood. Yankovic described the song as an "experiment". He "wanted to see if [he] could write a song as if Charlie Manson and James Taylor were collaborating."

=== Parodies ===
On February 18, 1988, Yankovic began recording four of the album's five parodies: "I Think I'm a Clone Now", "Alimony", "(This Song's Just) Six Words Long", and "Fat". The first of these is a spoof of on Tiffany's 1987 cover of "I Think We're Alone Now" that recounts the story of a man who lives with a clone of himself. "Alimony"—a parody of "Mony Mony" as covered by Billy Idol—is a musical diatribe aimed at the narrator's ex-wife, who has taken everything he owns for alimony payments. Although "Alimony" sounds as if it were recorded live—complete with clapping, screaming, and yelling—the track was entirely recorded in the studio. "(This Song's Just) Six Words Long" is a send up of James Ray's "Got My Mind Set on You" as performed by George Harrison of the Beatles about a song that does not have enough lyrics to fill 3 minutes worth of time. With the exception of "Fat", all of the album's parodies are based on songs originally released in the 1950s and 1960s that were covered and became popular in the 1980s.

"Fat" (sample)
"Fat", from Yankovic's 1988 album Even Worse. "Fat" was Yankovic's second Michael Jackson parody. Jackson was reportedly amused by the parody and its accompanying video.

When it came time to record a lead single, Yankovic once again turned his attention to Michael Jackson. Jackson had just released his album Bad, a follow-up to 1982's immensely successful album Thriller. After Yankovic first heard the lead single, "Bad", he immediately envisioned a parody entitled "Fat". Initially, Yankovic did not want to record another Jackson parody. He later said, "I was still primarily known as the 'Eat It' guy and I didn't want to become known as the guy who just rides Michael's coattails." He later relented and sought out Jackson for permission. Jackson, a fan of Yankovic's work, had already let Yankovic parody his 1983 hit single "Beat It". When presented with the new potential parody, Jackson not only approved it, but let Yankovic use his own Moonwalker subway set for the music video. Yankovic later presented Jackson with a gold record of Even Worse after the album sold over 500,000 copies. Jackson was so pleased with the song and video, he ordered twelve copies to give to his friends. Yankovic later said, "He doesn't have to let me do this kind of stuff. [...] The only reason he would let me is because he has a great sense of humor."

The music video for the song features a leather-clad Yankovic "expanding to 800 pounds and bouncing around a subway set." To find suitable back-up dancers, ads were placed in Los Angeles newspapers for "Very Fat Dancers". One of the men used in the video was actually a pizza delivery man who had delivered food to the casting offices. Due to the music video, "Fat" became one of Yankovic's biggest hits. Although only managing to peak at number 99 on the Billboard Hot 100, the song's music video got extensive play on MTV, which helped the album attain platinum status. In addition, "Fat" was later nominated and won a Grammy Award for Best Concept Music Video at the 1989 Grammy Awards, Yankovic's second Grammy Award.

"Lasagna" (sample)
"Lasagna", from Yankovic's 1988 album Even Worse. A parody of the traditional folk song "La Bamba", "Lasagna" is a playful ode to Italian culture and cuisine.

On February 19, 1988, Yankovic began recording the album's final parody: "Lasagna", a take on the traditional folk song "La Bamba". The song is mainly about Italian culture with a heavy emphasis on cuisine. When Yankovic began writing the song, he originally wanted it to be sung in Italian. He later said, "I was actually going through Italian phrase books and dictionaries until I realized that the humor would be lost on 99% of the audience, so I decided to do the whole thing in English but with kind of a bad Italian accent." Although "Lasagna" is a parody of the Los Lobos cover version of "La Bamba", Yankovic did not seek permission from the band to record his spoof, given that "La Bamba" is a traditional folk song with no attributable writer. In the liner notes to Even Worse, Yankovic is thus given sole credit for writing "Lasagna".

According to the Dallas Morning News, both Prince and George Michael turned down parody ideas that Yankovic asked permission to record for Even Worse. In addition, Even Worse did not contain a polka medley, Yankovic's second—after his debut—and last album not to include one. The album was originally set to include a polka of all U2 songs, but was left off the album due to licensing issues.

== Reception ==
=== Critical response ===
Professional ratings
Review scores
Source	Rating
AllMusic	4/5 stars
Pitchfork	7.3/10
Rolling Stone	2/5 stars
USA Today	positive

Even Worse has received relatively favorable reviews. AllMusic awarded Even Worse four out of five stars, one of the highest ratings for Yankovic on the site. Reviewer Eugene Chadbourne said, "Trust Weird Al Yankovic to name an album Even Worse even as his recordings were getting better again." Bruce Britt of Daily News of Los Angeles praised the album, and wrote that "It is tempting to dismiss 'Weird Al' Yankovic as a joke [...] but those who dismiss Yankovic so easily overlook the fact that his lampoons are often wittier than the songs he spoofs." Many critics praised the lead single, "Fat". Chadbourne wrote that "the arrogance of 'I'm Bad' [sic] was perfectly trumped by Yankovic's musical pile of lard, the appeal of the video's visuals clearly not the only ace in the hole." Britt called the song and video "so absurd, they are almost certain to be a hit this spring."

Unlike previous albums, which were praised for their parodies but criticized for their originals, Chadbourne wrote that "Yankovic even manages to shatter all previous barriers and comes up with some funny original material as well," citing "Good Old Days" and "Stuck in a Closet with Vanna White" as some of his best originals. Both Even Worse and "Fat" were nominated for Grammys. Although Even Worse was not a winner, "Fat" won a Grammy Award for Best Concept Music Video in 1989.

=== Commercial performance ===
Even Worse was released April 12, 1988, and, at the time of its release, was Yankovic's best-selling album. Even Worse peaked at number 27 on the Billboard 200 on July 2, 1988. The album spent a total of 26 weeks on the chart. On July 18, 1988—less than three months after its release—the album was certified Gold by the Recording Industry Association of America (RIAA). On January 27, 1994, the album was certified Platinum by the RIAA. At the time of its certification, it was Yankovic's first Platinum record and, until the release of Off the Deep End in 1992, it was his best-selling album.

On May 21, 1988, Yankovic appeared as a contestant on the game show Family Double Dare to promote Even Worse.

== Track listing ==
Side one
No.	Title	Writer(s)	Parody of	Length
1.	"Fat"	Michael Jackson, Alfred Yankovic	"Bad" by Michael Jackson	3:37
2.	"Stuck in a Closet with Vanna White"	Yankovic	Original glam rock song	4:58
3.	"(This Song's Just) Six Words Long"	Rudy Clark, Yankovic	"Got My Mind Set on You" by George Harrison	3:37
4.	"You Make Me"	Yankovic	Style parody of Oingo Boingo	3:06
5.	"I Think I'm a Clone Now"	Ritchie Cordell, Yankovic	"I Think We're Alone Now" by Tiffany	3:20

Side two
No.	Title	Writer(s)	Parody of	Length
6.	"Lasagna"	Yankovic	"La Bamba" by Los Lobos	2:46
7.	"Melanie"	Yankovic	Original	3:58
8.	"Alimony"	Tommy James, Bo Gentry, Ritchie Cordell, Robert Bloom, Yankovic	"Mony Mony" by Billy Idol	3:16
9.	"Velvet Elvis"	Yankovic	Style parody of the Police	4:30
10.	"Twister"	Yankovic	Style parody of Beastie Boys	1:03
11.	"Good Old Days"	Yankovic	Style parody of James Taylor	3:21
Total length:				37:32

== Personnel ==
Credits adapted from LP liner notes.

Band members

- "Weird Al" Yankovic – lead and background vocals, keyboards, accordion
- Jim West – guitars, mandolin, background vocals
- Steve Jay – bass guitar, background vocals
- Jon "Bermuda" Schwartz – drums, percussion

Additional musicians

- Kim Bullard – synthesizers
- Rick Derringer – guitar
- Joe Sublett – saxophone
- Ronny Jay – scratching
- Nicolette Larson – background vocals

Technical

- Rick Derringer – producer
- "Weird Al" Yankovic – arranger
- Tony Papa – engineer, mixing
- Jamey Dell – assistant engineer
- Tony Lane – art direction
- Nancy Donald – art direction
- Sam Emerson – photography
- Christine Wilson – Even Worse lettering

== Charts ==
Chart (1988)	Peak position
Canadian Albums Chart	23
New Zealand Albums Chart	44
US Billboard 200	27

== Certifications ==
Region	Certification	Certified units/sales
Canada (Music Canada)	Gold	50,000^{^}
United States (RIAA)	Platinum	1,000,000^{^}
^{^} Shipments figures based on certification alone.
