= Polka Party! =

1986 album by "Weird Al" Yankovic

Studio album by "Weird Al" Yankovic
- Released: October 21, 1986
- Recorded: April 22 – September 1, 1986
- Studio: Santa Monica Sound Recorders, Santa Monica
- Genre: Comedy; parody
- Length: 34:07
- Label: Rock 'n Roll; Scotti Brothers
- Producer: Rick Derringer

"Weird Al" Yankovic chronology
| Dare to Be Stupid (1985) | Polka Party! (1986) | Even Worse (1988) |

Alternate cover
- Cover in other countries

Singles from Polka Party!
- 1. "Living with a Hernia" Released: October 21, 1986; 2. "Christmas at Ground Zero" Released: November 1986

Polka Party! is the fourth studio album by the American parody musician "Weird Al" Yankovic, released on October 21, 1986. The album was produced by former The McCoys guitarist Rick Derringer. Recorded between April and September 1986, the album was Yankovic's follow-up to his successful 1985 release, Dare to Be Stupid. The album's lead single, "Living with a Hernia", failed to chart.

The music on Polka Party! is built around parodies and pastiches of pop and rock music of the mid-1980s, featuring direct parodies of James Brown, Mick Jagger, El DeBarge and Robert Palmer. The album also features many "style parodies", or musical imitations that come close to, but do not copy, existing artists. These style parodies include imitations of specific artists like Talking Heads, as well as imitations of various musical genres like country music.

Peaking at No. 177 on the Billboard 200, Polka Party! was met with mixed-to-negative reviews and was considered a commercial and critical failure. Despite this, the album was nominated for a Grammy Award for Best Comedy Recording in 1988. Polka Party! is one of Yankovic's few studio albums not to be certified either Gold or Platinum by the Recording Industry Association of America (RIAA).

== Production ==
=== Recording ===
Yankovic entered the recording studio in April 1986 to begin the sessions to his follow-up to 1985's Dare to Be Stupid. To produce the album, Yankovic brought in former McCoys guitarist Rick Derringer, who had also produced Yankovic's previous albums. Backing Yankovic were Jon "Bermuda" Schwartz on drums, Steve Jay on bass, and Jim West on guitar. The album was recorded in roughly three sessions. The first session took place between April 22 and 23, and yielded four originals: "Don't Wear Those Shoes", "One of Those Days", "Dog Eat Dog", and "Christmas at Ground Zero". The second session, which spanned August 4–5, produced three parodies: "Living with a Hernia", "Addicted to Spuds", and "Here's Johnny". The final session, which lasted from August 29 to September 1, produced the parody "Toothless People", an original song named "Good Enough for Now", and the album's titular polka medley. Thematically, Yankovic described the record as "not a whole lot different than" the other albums he had recorded, calling the process "even a bit formulaic".

=== Originals ===
On April 22, 1986, Yankovic began recording three new original songs for his next album: "Don't Wear Those Shoes", "One of Those Days", and "Dog Eat Dog". Although "Don't Wear Those Shoes" is an original composition, Yankovic admitted that the intro was inspired by the style of The Kinks. Lyrically, the song is a plea by the singer to his wife to not wear certain shoes which he cannot stand. "One of Those Days" is a song detailing horrible things as if they were everyday annoyances. Each horrible thing escalates up to global annihilation while more mundane annoyances pop up at different times.

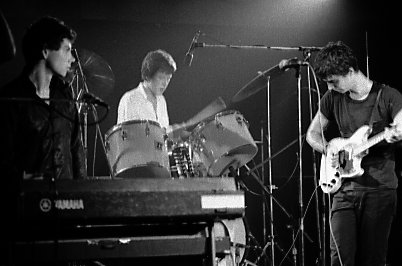
Yankovic's song "Dog Eat Dog" served as a style parody of Talking Heads (pictured).

"Dog Eat Dog" (sample)
"Dog Eat Dog", from Yankovic's 1986 album Polka Party!. The sample illustrates the stylistic similarities between the song and the music of Talking Heads.

"Dog Eat Dog" is a style parody of Talking Heads. Described as a "tongue-in-cheek look at office life", the song was inspired by Yankovic's past experience of working in the mailroom and traffic department at the Westwood One radio station. He noted, "At first I thought [the job] was kinda cool that I had a phone and a desk and a little cubicle to call my own, but after a while I felt like my soul had been sucked out of me." The song features a line directly parodying the Talking Heads song "Once In a Lifetime": "Sometimes I tell myself, this is not my beautiful stapler/Sometimes I tell myself, this is not my beautiful chair!" This mirrors a similar line in the Talking Heads song: "You may tell yourself, this is not my beautiful house/You may tell yourself, this is not my beautiful wife".

On April 23, Yankovic recorded "Christmas at Ground Zero". The song, "a cheery little tune about death, destruction and the end of the world" was the result of Scotti Brothers Records' insistence that Yankovic release a Christmas record. After Yankovic presented the song to his label, they relented, because it was "a little different from what they were expecting." After the song's release, some radio stations banned the record, a move that Yankovic attributes to "most people [not wanting] to hear about nuclear annihilation during the holiday season." Following the September 11 attacks, when the general term "ground zero" was co-opted as a proper name for the World Trade Center site where two of those attacks took place, the disturbing lyrics caused this song to be banned largely from radio. Yankovic wanted the song to receive a video, but due to budget reasons, his label did not agree. Yankovic, however, directed one himself which was mostly made up of stock footage, with a live action finale that was filmed in a run-down part of the Bronx, New York that "looked like a bomb had fallen on it."

The final original that was recorded was "Good Enough for Now", a country music pastiche about how the singer's lover, while not the best, will do for now.

=== Parodies and polka ===
"Living with a Hernia" (sample)
"Living with a Hernia", from Yankovic's 1986 album Polka Party!. The sample illustrates Yankovic's parody, including the musical re-creation of the original song.

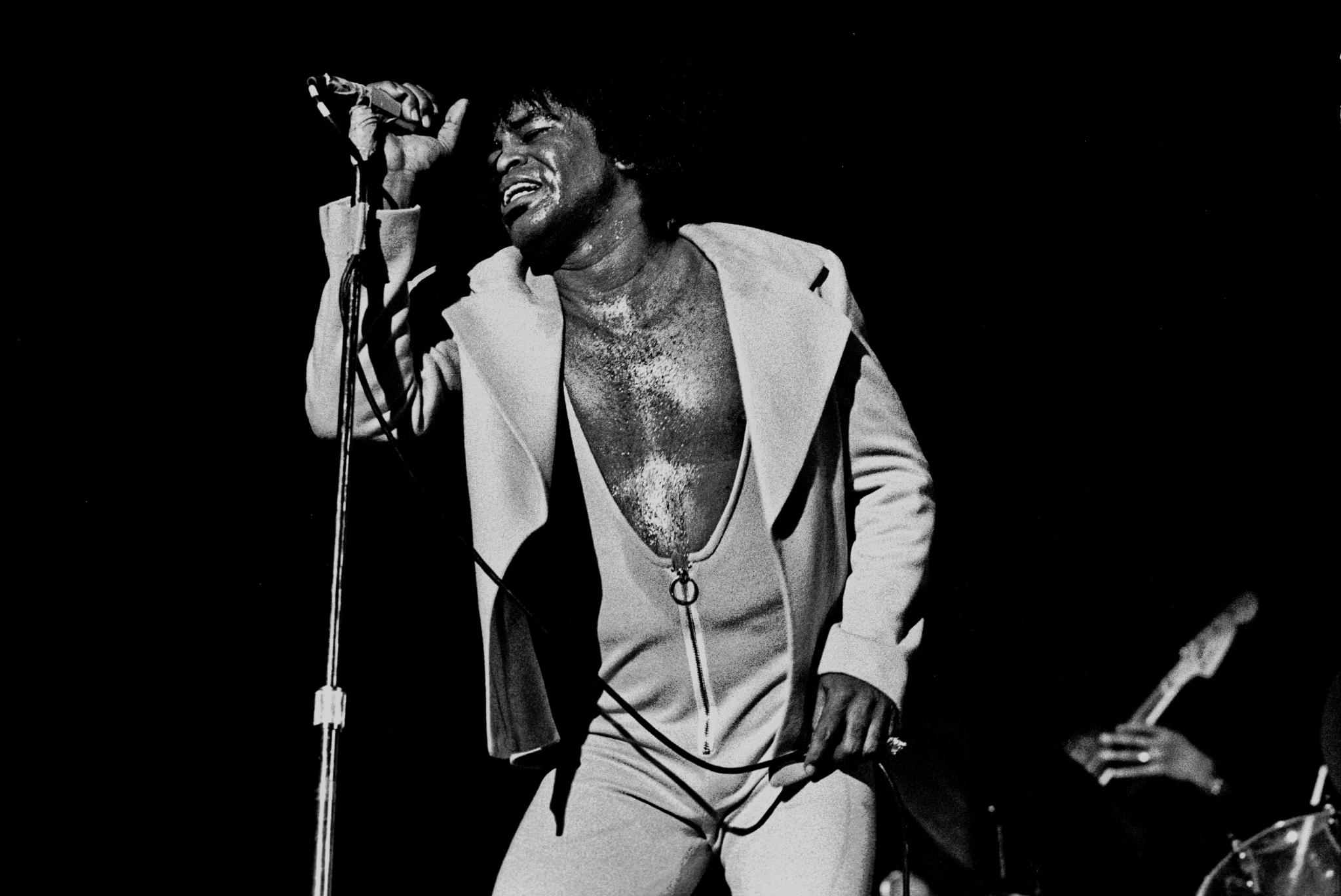
The album's lead parody, "Living with a Hernia", is a parody of James Brown's (pictured) single "Living in America".

On August 4, Yankovic began recording parodies starting with "Living with a Hernia". The song, a spoof of "Living in America" by James Brown—which was also the theme to the 1985 film Rocky IV—is about hernias. When it came time to pick a song to parody as the lead single for Polka Party! Scotti Brothers Records "had some very strong ideas" and wished to have Yankovic parody a musician who was signed on the same label. After "Living in America" became a hit, the record label insisted that Yankovic parody the song, to which Yankovic obliged. In order to accurately write the song, Yankovic researched the various types of hernias. Yankovic noted that "it was a real thrill to do James Brown. I'm a total non-dancer, never went to any dances in high school, but if I analytically dissect a dance routine I can figure it out." A choreographer named Chester Whitmore was hired to accurately create the dance scenes featured in the video, which was shot on the concert set actually used in the movie Rocky IV. The second parody recorded was "Addicted to Spuds", a pastiche of "Addicted to Love" by Robert Palmer, about a man's obsession for potatoes and potato-based dishes. A music video for the song was never made because there was a strict budget for videos for the album, and Yankovic felt that the video would be "one joke" and not really worth its own video. A parody of Palmer's video, however, was later inserted into Al's "UHF" video.

On August 5, Yankovic recorded "Here's Johnny", a parody of "Who's Johnny" by El DeBarge. The song, a loving ode to The Tonight Show Starring Johnny Carson announcer Ed McMahon, features John Roarke of the television series Fridays fame doing an impression of McMahon's voice. According to Yankovic, Peter Wolf, the man who wrote "Who's Johnny", enjoyed the parody idea so much that he personally brought into the studio the floppy disc that contained the song's programmed synthesizer parts. The final parody recorded for the album was "Toothless People", a play on Mick Jagger's "Ruthless People", which was recorded on August 29, 1986. The song, about elderly people who are missing their teeth, was written after Yankovic heard it would be the theme to the 1986 film Ruthless People. Assuming the song would be a hit, Yankovic requested and received permission from Jagger to record a parody version. Jagger's song, however, was never a hit, but because Jagger had "approved" the parody, he decided that failing to produce it would be an "insult" to the artist.

The album's polka medley, the titular "Polka Party!", was recorded on the same day as "Here's Johnny". This was Yankovic's third polka medley, and his only medley to bear the same name as an album. Like his other medleys, the song is a conglomeration of then-popular songs in music.

== Reception ==
=== Promotion ===
To promote the album's release, Scotti Brothers Records purchased full-page ads in Billboard magazine that advertised the release as Yankovic's "biggest bash yet". Unlike previous albums, Yankovic did not undertake a tour to promote Polka Party! Instead, he opened for the American rock band the Monkees; Yankovic later joked that the Monkees merely "closed" for him. Yankovic explained that while it "was a fun tour" and that the crowds were very enthusiastic, the tension between the Monkees was obvious; on his website, he wrote that while the band members "are all terrific people individually", they "didn't seem to get along all that great when they weren't on stage."

=== Critical response ===
Professional ratings
Review scores
| Source | Rating |
|---|---|
| AllMusic | 3/5 stars |
| The Daily Vault | F |
| Pitchfork | 6.1/10 |
| Rolling Stone | 3.5/5 stars |

Polka Party! received mixed to negative reviews from critics. AllMusic reviewer Eugene Chadbourne gave the album three stars and wrote that "just about anyone could feel let down by this album." Chadbourne was largely critical of the parody choices, noting that many of the original versions would be forgotten in "fifteen years". Christopher Thelen from The Daily Vault gave Polka Party! an F and described it as an album that "seemed like it could well have been the 'last call' for Yankovic." Thelen heavily criticized the record, writing that both the parodies and originals were not good and that "Yankovic [was] going through the motions". Rolling Stone awarded the album three-and-a-half stars, tying it with the 1992 album Off the Deep End and the 1999 release Running with Scissors as Yankovic's best-rated album. Although it was not a critical success, the album was nominated for a Grammy Award for Best Comedy Recording in 1987, but lost to Bill Cosby's Those of You with or Without Children, You'll Understand.

Despite the album's lackluster reception, many of the songs on the album, such as "Dog Eat Dog", "Addicted to Spuds", and "Christmas at Ground Zero", went on to become fan favorites and live staples. Two of the album's tracks, "Living with a Hernia" and "Addicted to Spuds", appeared on Yankovic's first greatest hits album (1988), "Christmas at Ground Zero" appeared on the second volume (1994). In addition, the 1994 box set Permanent Record: Al in the Box contained five of the album's songs: "Addicted to Spuds", "Dog Eat Dog", "Here's Johnny", "Living with a Hernia", and "Christmas at Ground Zero". Only "Dog Eat Dog", however, appeared on Yankovic's 2009 Essential collection, although the 3.0 version contained "Living with a Hernia".

=== Commercial performance ===
Polka Party! was released October 21, 1986. After it was released, the album peaked at No. 177 on the Billboard 200. Compared to Yankovic's previous albums—Dare to Be Stupid peaked at No. 50 and In 3-D peaked at No. 17—Polka Party! was considered a commercial disappointment for the comedian. The album was the lowest-charting studio album released by Yankovic and is one of his few studio albums not to be certified either Gold or Platinum by the Recording Industry Association of America (RIAA). The others include the soundtrack to his film UHF (1989) and Poodle Hat (2003).

Yankovic was dismayed by the album's lackluster reception. He noted that he "thought it was the end of [his] career". Yankovic explained that "I figured I'd peaked with 'Eat It' and 'Like a Surgeon' and now people were slowly forgetting about me and I was well on my way to obscurity." However, Yankovic's next album, Even Worse, would resurrect his career and become his best-selling album at the time; the experience led Yankovic to realize that "careers have peaks and valleys, and whenever I go through the rough times, another peak might be right around the corner."

== Track listing ==
Side one
| No. | Title | Writer(s) | Parody of | Length |
|---|---|---|---|---|
| 1. | "Living with a Hernia" | Daniel Hartman, Charlie Midnight, Alfred Yankovic | "Living in America" by James Brown | 3:20 |
| 2. | "Dog Eat Dog" | Yankovic | Style parody of Talking Heads | 3:42 |
| 3. | "Addicted to Spuds" | Robert Palmer, Yankovic | "Addicted to Love" by Robert Palmer | 3:50 |
| 4. | "One of Those Days" | Yankovic | Original in the style of Glam Rock | 3:18 |
| 5. | "Polka Party!" | Various | A polka medley including: "Sledgehammer" by Peter Gabriel; "Sussudio" by Phil Collins; "Party All the Time" by Eddie Murphy; "Say You, Say Me" by Lionel Richie; "Freeway of Love" by Aretha Franklin; "What You Need" by INXS; "Harlem Shuffle" (as "Harlem Polka") by The Rolling Stones; "Venus" by Bananarama; "Nasty" by Janet Jackson; "Rock Me Amadeus" by Falco; "Shout" by Tears for Fears; "Papa Don't Preach" by Madonna; "Ear Booker Polka" by "Weird Al" Yankovic | 3:15 |

Side two
| No. | Title | Writer(s) | Parody of | Length |
|---|---|---|---|---|
| 6. | "Here's Johnny" | Peter Wolf, Ina Wolf, Yankovic | "Who's Johnny" by El DeBarge | 3:24 |
| 7. | "Don't Wear Those Shoes" | Yankovic | Style parody of The Kinks | 3:36 |
| 8. | "Toothless People" | Daryl Hohl, Michael Jagger, David Stewart, Yankovic | "Ruthless People" by Mick Jagger | 3:23 |
| 9. | "Good Enough for Now" | Yankovic | Style parody of country love songs | 3:03 |
| 10. | "Christmas at Ground Zero" | Yankovic | Style parody of Phil Spector-produced Christmas songs | 3:09 |
| Total length: | | | | 34:07 |

== Personnel ==
Credits adapted from LP liner notes.

Band members

- "Weird Al" Yankovic – lead and background vocals, accordion, keyboards, glockenspiel
- Jim West – guitars, background vocals
- Steve Jay – bass guitar, banjo, background vocals
- Jon "Bermuda" Schwartz – drums, percussion

Additional musicians

- Pat Regan – synthesizers
- Rick Derringer – guitars
- Lisa Popeil – background vocals
- The Waters Sisters – background vocals
- Warren Luening – trumpet
- Bill Anderson – tenor saxophone
- Gary Herbig – baritone saxophone
- Joel Peskin – clarinet
- Tommy Johnson – tuba
- Jim Cox – pedal steel synth
- Dennis Fetchet – fiddle
- Sonny Burke – piano
- John Roarke – voice of Ed McMahon

Technical

- Rick Derringer – producer
- "Weird Al" Yankovic – arranger
- Tony Papa – engineer, mixing
- Jamey Dell – assistant engineer
- Lane/Donald – art direction
- Dennis Keeley – cover pictures

== Charts ==
| Chart | Peak position |
|---|---|
| US Billboard 200 | 177 |
