= Trapped in the Drive-Thru =

2006 song by "Weird Al" Yankovic

Song by "Weird Al" Yankovic

from the album Straight Outta Lynwood
- Released: September 26, 2006
- Recorded: February 19, 2006
- Genre: Comedy hip hop; R&B; rap opera
- Length: 10:51
- Label: Volcano
- Songwriters: "Weird Al" Yankovic; R. Kelly; Jimmy Page; Robert Plant; John Paul Jones
- Producer: "Weird Al" Yankovic

Straight Outta Lynwood track listing
- 12 tracks: 1. "White & Nerdy"; 2. "Pancreas"; 3. "Canadian Idiot"; 4. "I'll Sue Ya"; 5. "Polkarama!"; 6. "Virus Alert"; 7. "Confessions Part III"; 8. "Weasel Stomping Day"; 9. "Close But No Cigar"; 10. "Do I Creep You Out"; 11. "Trapped in the Drive-Thru"; 12. "Don't Download This Song"

"Trapped in the Drive-Thru" is the eleventh song from "Weird Al" Yankovic's twelfth studio album Straight Outta Lynwood, which was released on September 26, 2006. This song is a parody of Trapped in the Closet by R. Kelly. To date, the song is Yankovic's longest parody, and his second longest song ever released on his studio albums (with the longest being "Albuquerque").

The song contains an interpolation of "Black Dog" by Led Zeppelin at 6:24, when the main character turns on the radio. The interpolation was recorded by Yankovic's band. Zeppelin guitarist Jimmy Page is a noted fan of Yankovic's work, but had previously denied permission for Yankovic to perform a Led Zeppelin polka medley on an album. However, when Al first contacted Led Zeppelin, they didn’t respond. So his band recorded a snippet of the song “My Sharona” by The Knack because Al wanted to include a song that “was recognizable without lyrics”. But then Led Zeppelin responded to Al and he included “Black Dog” in the end.

The song was listed by Rolling Stone as number seventy-seven in their Best Songs of 2006.

== Origin and writing ==
Yankovic felt compelled to write this parody because he felt the original was "brilliant and wonderful and ridiculous all at the same time". Yankovic would normally have considered taking the original song and making lyrics that were "more bizarre than they already are", but the original R. Kelly song was already bizarre to start with, according to Yankovic. Instead, to contrast the original, "Trapped in the Drive-Thru" uses the very dramatic structure of the original to tell an extremely banal tale of a couple's attempts to pick up their dinner one night, one of the most "banal and mundane" stories Yankovic could think of.

Much like how the original was divided into various chapters (as of now 33), Yankovic's is also divided into 3 chapters, although they are not divided on the album itself. Yankovic had received R. Kelly's permission to parody the song, but due to its length, he was worried that he would have to pay 2-3 times the normal statutory rate for inclusion on the album, which would have potentially forced him to remove one or two songs from Straight Outta Lynwood. However, Kelly allowed Yankovic to use the full song at the rate of a single song, allowing Yankovic to keep his album intact.

== Music video ==
An animated music video was released on MySpace on March 19, 2007. The video is now on YouTube and has received over 33 million views as of November 2025. The video was created by Doug Bresler, creator of Doogtoons. It was the ninth music video produced for the album Straight Outta Lynwood.

The video was also featured as Channel Frederator's 100th episode. In June 2008, "Trapped in the Drive-Thru" received the award of Funniest Film of 2007 at the Channel Frederator Awards.

== Personnel ==
According to the liner notes of The Essential "Weird Al" Yankovic:

- "Weird Al" Yankovic – lead & background vocals, keyboards, producer
- Jim West – guitar
- Steve Jay – synth bass
- Jon "Bermuda" Schwartz – synthesizers
- Kim Bullard – keyboards
