= Pancreas (song) =

Song by "Weird Al" Yankovic

from the album Straight Outta Lynwood
- Released: September 26, 2006
- Genre: Parody
- Length: 3:48
- Label: Volcano
- Songwriter: "Weird Al" Yankovic
- Producer: "Weird Al" Yankovic

Straight Outta Lynwood track listing
- 12 tracks: 1. "White & Nerdy"; 2. "Pancreas"; 3. "Canadian Idiot"; 4. "I'll Sue Ya"; 5. "Polkarama!"; 6. "Virus Alert"; 7. "Confessions Part III"; 8. "Weasel Stomping Day"; 9. "Close But No Cigar"; 10. "Do I Creep You Out"; 11. "Trapped in the Drive-Thru"; 12. "Don't Download This Song"

Music video
- "Pancreas" on YouTube

"Pancreas" is a song by American musician Weird Al Yankovic from his 2006 album Straight Outta Lynwood. It is a pastiche of the Beach Boys' Pet Sounds and Smile albums.

== Overview ==
The final original song recorded for the album, it is mainly about the biological functions of the aforementioned organ. Yankovic joked that the reason the song was written was because "my pancreas has given so much to me over the years, I felt like I needed to give something back to it".

"Pancreas" is in the style of the Beach Boys' Brian Wilson, specifically his band's 1966 album Pet Sounds and their aborted follow-up, Smile, which Wilson had completed as a solo record in 2004.

== Music video ==
Jim Blashfield created a video for "Pancreas" using stock footage from the Prelinger Archives.

== Critical reception ==
In his review of Straight Outta Lynwood, Scott Shetler of Slant praised "Pancreas" as "an exquisitely crafted homage to Brian Wilson featuring the layered harmonies and fun instrumentation (toy piano, sleigh bells, ukulele, vibraphone) characteristic of the Beach Boys. The purposefully absurd lyrics prove that Wilson's classic sound would be great even if he were singing about nonsense." In 2014, LA Times contributor Randall Roberts rated "Pancreas" among Yankovic's eight best parodies.

== Personnel ==
According to the liner notes of The Essential "Weird Al" Yankovic:

- "Weird Al" Yankovic – lead & background vocals, piano, harpsichord, vibraphone, tannerin, accordion, harmonica, bass harmonica, toy piano, finger snaps, hand claps
- Jim West – acoustic guitar, banjo, ukulele, finger snaps, hand claps
- Steve Jay – bass guitar, banjo, flute, finger snaps, hand claps
- Jon "Bermuda" Schwartz – drums, sleigh bells, timpani, tambourine, wood blocks, shaker, jaw harp, siren whistle, slide whistle, claves, casaba, bicycle bell, finger snaps, hand claps
- Miles Jay – string bass
- Sarah O'Brien – cello
- John Dickson – French horn
- Lee Thomberg – trumpet
- Nick Lane – trombone
