= Don't Download This Song =

2006 single by "Weird Al" Yankovic

Single by "Weird Al" Yankovic

from the album Straight Outta Lynwood
- A-side: "White & Nerdy"
- Released: August 21, 2006
- Recorded: July 5, 2005
- Genre: Comedy pop, gospel
- Length: 3:54
- Label: Volcano; Zomba
- Songwriter: "Weird Al" Yankovic
- Producer: "Weird Al" Yankovic

"Weird Al" Yankovic singles chronology
"You're Pitiful" (2006)	"Don't Download This Song" (2006)	"White & Nerdy" (2006)

Straight Outta Lynwood track listing
- 12 tracks: 1. "White & Nerdy"; 2. "Pancreas"; 3. "Canadian Idiot"; 4. "I'll Sue Ya"; 5. "Polkarama!"; 6. "Virus Alert"; 7. "Confessions Part III"; 8. "Weasel Stomping Day"; 9. "Close But No Cigar"; 10. "Do I Creep You Out"; 11. "Trapped in the Drive-Thru"; 12. "Don't Download This Song"

Music video
- "Don't Download This Song" on YouTube

"Don't Download This Song" is the first single from "Weird Al" Yankovic's 12th studio album Straight Outta Lynwood. The song was released on August 21, 2006, exclusively as a digital download. It is a style parody of "We Are the World", "Voices That Care", "Hands Across America", "Heal the World" and other similar charity songs. The song "describes the perils of online music file-sharing" in a tongue-in-cheek manner. To further the sarcasm, the song was freely available for streaming and to legally download in DRM-free MP3 file format at Weird Al's Myspace page, a standalone website, and his YouTube channel.

== Background ==
"Don't Download This Song" references several court cases related to the RIAA and copyright infringement of music. Among these are lawsuits against "a grandma" (presumably Gertrude Walton, who was sued for copyright infringement six months after dying) and a "7-year-old girl" (presumably a reference to Tanya Andersen's daughter sued at age 10 for alleged copyright infringements made at the age of 7), as well as Lars Ulrich's strong stance against copyright infringement of music in the days of Napster. The song also challenges the RIAA's claim that file sharing prevents the artists from profiting from their work, as the song argues that they are still very financially successful via their recording contracts: "Don't take away money from artists just like me/How else can I afford another solid-gold Humvee, And diamond-studded swimming pools? These things don't grow on trees." Mention is also made of Tommy Chong's time spent in prison.

Yankovic's own views on file sharing are less clear-cut:

I have very mixed feelings about it. On one hand, I’m concerned that the rampant downloading of my copyright-protected material over the Internet is severely eating into my album sales and having a decidedly adverse effect on my career. On the other hand, I can get all the Metallica songs I want for FREE! WOW!!!!!

— "Weird Al" Yankovic, "Ask Al" Q&As for May 2000

Yankovic's intention was to leave the listener with no clear understanding of Yankovic's own views on the matter, "all by design".

== Music video ==
The music video, animated by Bill Plympton, premiered August 22, 2006, on Yahoo! Music. It depicts the vision of the capture, trial, imprisonment, attempted execution, escape, and burning of a young boy who burns a CD on his computer. The boy's death, where he stands on top of a tower just before it explodes, parodies the film White Heat, where Cody Jarrett, played by James Cagney, dies in a similar fashion. Various people, from policemen to criminals to even sharks and dogs, are then seen celebrating throughout the ending chorus. But at the end, it turns out the boy is just imagining what would happen if he downloaded the song, so he throws away the burned CD and goes back to playing his guitar. Throughout the song, the video coloring gradually changes from color to grayscale to dark grayscale to yellowed.

On MTV's MTV Music site where this music video is available, they have censored the names of the file sharing programs in the song, such as LimeWire or KaZaA. Weird Al explained that MTV contacted him and told him they would not air his video if the references to the filesharing programs were not in some way removed, so he "made the creative decision to bleep them out as obnoxiously as possible, so that there would be no mistake I was being censored."

The video was praised by the Annie Awards and was subsequently nominated for Best Animated Short Subject for its 34th ceremony, but was beat out by the Ice Age featurette No Time for Nuts.

== Personnel ==
According to the liner notes of The Essential "Weird Al" Yankovic:

- "Weird Al" Yankovic – lead vocals, choir vocals
- Jim West – guitar, choir vocals
- Steve Jay – bass guitar, choir vocals
- Jon "Bermuda" Schwartz – drums, electronic drums, tambourine, bar chimes
- Kim Bullard – keyboards
- John Dickson – French horn
- Lee Thomberg – trumpet
- Nick Lane – trombone
- Lisa Popeil – choir vocals
- Angie Jaree – choir vocals
- Kim Erin – choir vocals
- Monique Donnelly – choir vocals
- David Joyce – choir vocals
- Randy Crenshaw – choir vocals

== See also ==
- List of singles by "Weird Al" Yankovic
- List of songs by "Weird Al" Yankovic
- “Christian Rock Hard”
