= You're Pitiful =

2006 song performed by "Weird Al" Yankovic

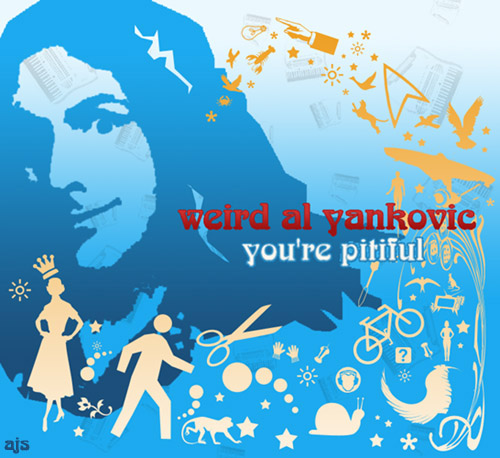

Single by "Weird Al" Yankovic
- Released: June 7, 2006
- Recorded: April 12, 2006
- Genre: Comedy rock, pop rock
- Length: 3:16
- Label: Volcano
- Songwriters: James Blunt; Sacha Skarbek; Amanda Ghost; Jason Guerra; Alfred Yankovic
- Producer: Al Yankovic

"Weird Al" Yankovic singles chronology
"Pretty Fly for a Rabbi" (1999)	"You're Pitiful" (2006)	"Don't Download This Song" (2006)

"You're Pitiful" is a parody of the James Blunt song "You're Beautiful" written and recorded by American parody musician "Weird Al" Yankovic. It was released exclusively online on June 7, 2006. In it, Yankovic chides a 42-year-old man who lives a pitiful existence. It was originally intended as the lead single of his twelfth studio album, Straight Outta Lynwood.

While Blunt had no issues with Yankovic recording the parody, his label, Atlantic Records, forbade a commercial release. In a later music video and live performances, Yankovic referred unflatteringly to Atlantic. He occasionally and unsuccessfully asks to include the song on compilations.

== Synopsis ==
According to music critic Nathan Rabin, "You're Pitiful" functions as "an amusing character study of the contemporary loser". In the song, Yankovic chides a 42-year-old man who still lives a "pitiful" existence. The man is described in the lyrics as living with his mother and having a job at a convenience store working the Slurpee machine. His hobbies include playing Halo 2 and dabbling in amateur Star Trek cosplay.

== Recording and controversy ==
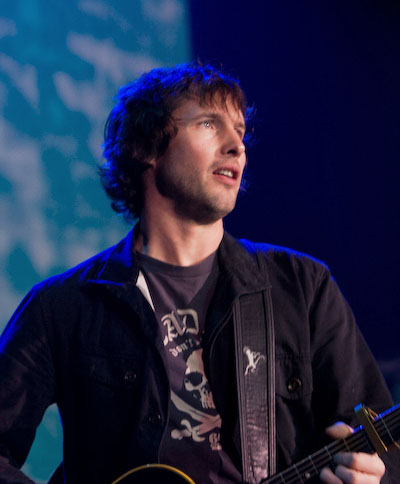
"You're Beautiful" was originally performed by British singer James Blunt.

In early 2006, Yankovic began recording parody songs for his upcoming album Straight Outta Lynwood. Yankovic initially approached James Blunt and asked if he could record a parody of his hit song "You're Beautiful". Blunt was receptive of the parody idea, and gave Yankovic permission; on April 12, 2006, Yankovic began recording the song. When Yankovic and his record company Volcano announced Straight Outta Lynwood would be released on June 27, 2006, Atlantic Records contacted Yankovic and said that they did not want this parody to be released.

Atlantic Records feared that "it was 'too early' in James' career for a parody, and [...] focusing any more attention on 'Beautiful' at that point might lead to the perception of James as a 'one-hit wonder'." Yankovic found this particularly odd, because in his experience, it was generally the artists who were unwilling to want parodies recorded and not record labels (as parody songs generate royalties, which in turn generate revenue for the label). According to Yankovic, "They didn't say I couldn't do the parody ... they just said they'd let me know 'when the time was right'." As such, Yankovic and his record label postponed the album's release date and cancelled their upcoming tour. Finally, months later, Yankovic got a response from Atlantic: "The 'right' time, apparently, was 'never'."

Yankovic had a policy of obtaining approval prior to releasing his parodies from the original artist's record company, but after a miscommunication surrounding "Amish Paradise", a parody of Coolio's "Gangsta's Paradise", he sought permission directly from the artist. Yankovic told NPR that it was the first time a record label had denied a release of one of his parodies. Given that Blunt had given his blessing to record the parody, Yankovic noted that there was no way Atlantic could legally forbid the parody: "James Blunt could still let me put it on my album if he really wanted to, but he obviously doesn't want to alienate his own record company ... and my label could release the parody without Atlantic's blessing, but they don't really want to go to war with another label over this." In the end, Yankovic concluded that the issue was "more of a political matter than a legal matter".

Because Blunt had no issue with the parody, and because it had already been recorded, Yankovic released it online as a free digital download. "[I]f James Blunt himself were objecting," Yankovic told NPR, "I wouldn't even offer my parody for free on my Web site. But since it's a bunch of suits – who are actually going against their own artist's wishes – I have absolutely no problem with it." The song was later officially mirrored on a number of "Weird Al" Yankovic fansites and blogs, including Al-oholics Anonymous, WeirdAlForum, WeirdAlStar, WeirdAlShow, and AllThingsYank. Still needing a lead parody for his album, Yankovic recorded "White & Nerdy" (a parody of Chamillionaire's "Ridin'"). This single would go on to be Yankovic's most-popular song, and his first top 10 Billboard hit.

The digital single's cover art (spoofing the cover of Blunt's album Back to Bedlam) was the product of a fan named Aron Shay, which had been submitted to the fansite Al-oholics Anonymous as part of a calendar contest. The image was later used on Yankovic's official MySpace page, and has since become the de facto cover art for the single.

== Aftermath ==
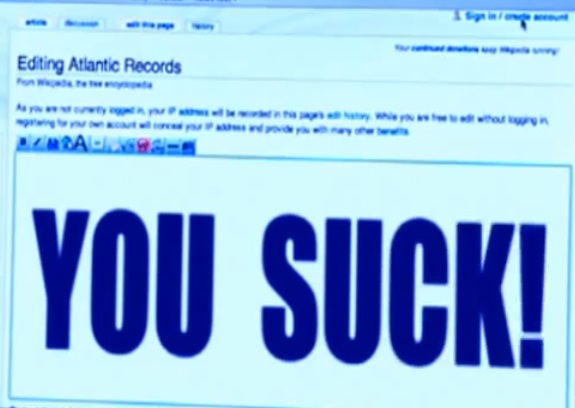
Still from "White & Nerdy", showing the vandalism of Atlantic Records' English Wikipedia page

The music video for Straight Outta Lynwood's second single, "White & Nerdy", depicts Yankovic taking revenge, of sorts, against Atlantic Records by vandalizing their English Wikipedia article by blanking all text and replacing it with the words "YOU SUCK!" in large letters. This particular revenge has since actually been repeatedly performed by online vandals. Yankovic has said that he does not approve of the vandalism, although he admits being amused by it. In addition, the video also shows Yankovic viewing his MySpace page and for a split second, "You're Pitiful" is visible as his profile song.

In 2009, while compiling the track listing for his then-upcoming greatest hits album The Essential "Weird Al" Yankovic, Blunt and his company were once again approached by Yankovic, now asking they allow the long-shelved parody be released on the compilation record. The request was denied, and Yankovic later tweeted: "In case you were hoping for 'You're Pitiful' to be included on my Essentials collection, sorry, this just in from Blunt's manager: 'Thanks for your email, but both James and I will never approve this parody to be released on any label.'"

In mid-2016, while preparing to release his career-spanning box set Squeeze Box, Yankovic once again reached out to Blunt to see if in the seven years he had changed his mind. Once again, he was denied, tweeting: "Sadly, [James Blunt] won't let me include 'You're Pitiful' on my box set."

== Reception ==
Nathan Rabin wrote that the parody was amusing but that "it was nowhere near as strong as the geek anthem [i.e. 'White & Nerdy'] that would become the first single off [of] 2006's Straight Outta Lynwood".

In April 2011, Blunt discussed Yankovic and the parody with the Seattle Post-Intelligencer, saying:

I'm a fan of his, particularly the earliest stuff he did, though he got his notoriety and his fame for what were genius moments along the way, and they were really exciting. And for me, I've only been flattered by parodies of my own songs. There are some great ones out there. I have absolutely no problem with Al. I think it's a huge compliment for what he's done. At the same time, it's generally not my favorite of the parodies. I think it was a safe one. It wasn't as exciting as some others. There's one really special one which you should look up by a guy called Tom Gleeson, and it's just really clever. And for me, that was a more exciting one.

== Live performances ==
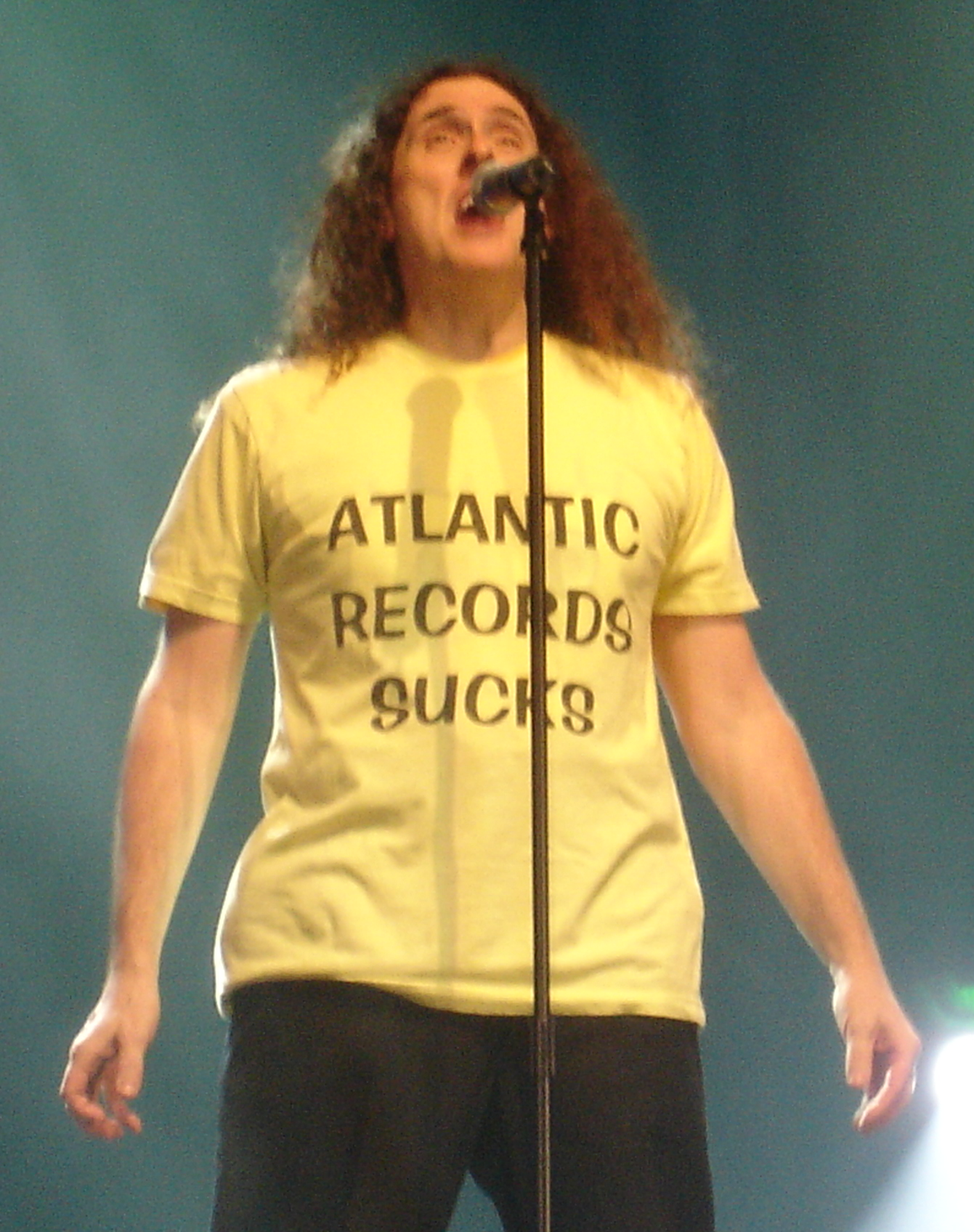
Weird Al wearing his "Atlantic Records Sucks" shirt during a performance of "You're Pitiful", on August 8, 2007, at the Ohio State Fair.

On the concert tour for Straight Outta Lynwood, Yankovic performed the song initially wearing a long-sleeved shirt, and progressively removed clothing to reveal different layers underneath (as Blunt does in the music video for "You're Beautiful"). The penultimate T-shirt revealed says "Atlantic Records Sucks". During his 2010 tour, this shirt was modified from the original, stating "Atlantic Records STILL Sucks". It was after they denied "You're Pitiful" being put on his 2011 album Alpocalypse. The final T-shirt is the face of SpongeBob SquarePants. Yankovic then removed his pants to reveal boxer shorts with red hearts, a pink tutu, and fishnet stockings. The final outfit was first revealed in 2008.

== Credits and personnel ==
Band members

- Al Yankovic – vocals, keyboards
- Jim West – guitars, keyboard programming, backup vocals
- Steve Jay – bass guitar, backup vocals
- Jon "Bermuda" Schwartz – drums, percussion, drum programming, backup vocals

Production

- Al Yankovic – producer, arranging
- Tony Papa – sound engineering, mixing

== See also ==
- White & Nerdy music video
- List of songs by "Weird Al" Yankovic
