= Albuquerque (song) =

1999 song performed by "Weird Al" Yankovic

Song by "Weird Al" Yankovic

from the album Running with Scissors
- Released: June 29, 1999
- Recorded: October 15, 1998
- Genre: Comedy rock; spoken word; hard rock; rock
- Length: 11:23
- Label: Volcano
- Songwriter: "Weird Al" Yankovic
- Producer: "Weird Al" Yankovic

"Albuquerque" is the last song of "Weird Al" Yankovic's 1999 album Running with Scissors. At 11 minutes and 23 seconds, it is the longest song Yankovic has ever recorded.

With the exception of the choruses and occasional bridges, the track is mostly a spoken word narration about a made-up person's life in Albuquerque, New Mexico, after winning a first-class one-way airplane ticket to the city.

According to Yankovic, the song is in the style of the "hard-driving rock narrative" of artists like The Rugburns, Mojo Nixon and George Thorogood. Singer-songwriter Steve Poltz of The Rugburns stated in a 2024 interview that Yankovic had attended the band's shows and "loved" their song "Dick's Automotive", and "because of 'Dick's Automotive', Weird Al wrote the song 'Albuquerque'", describing it as "a direct takeoff of the Rugburns" and noting that the band was not credited at the time.

== Writing ==
In a video on GQ in which he broke down his most iconic songs, Yankovic said he had finished writing the song and needed to cut it down to song length, but then he decided "No! I'm not going to cut it down, I'm just going to do the whole thing!"

Yankovic set off to write the lengthy song, considering it as a final track for Running with Scissors. The long, meandering story was not expected to be popular and instead Yankovic wanted to compose a song "that's just going to annoy people for 12 minutes", making it feel like an "odyssey" for the listener after making it through to the end. Yankovic described writing the song as "free flowing," writing down a great deal of material he thought would be funny including previous anecdotes he had recorded, and trimming it down to form a lengthy "semi-cohesive story." The lyrics were too long to include in the liner notes for the album (it ends mid-sentence and goes into a written apology by Yankovic), saying that the listener will have to figure them out for themselves. The full lyrics were posted to Yankovic's website.

== Plot ==
The song begins with the narrator talking about a traumatic childhood, living "in a box under the stairs in the corner of the basement of the house half a block down the street from Jerry's Bait Shop, you know the place." where he is force-fed sauerkraut by his mother, who claims that it is for his own health, until he turns 26½ years old. Enraged, the narrator swears that he will leave his mother's house, soon winning a radio contest about guessing the number of molecules in Leonard Nimoy's buttocks. Despite being off by three, he wins the grand prize: a first-class one-way ticket to Albuquerque, New Mexico.

After a miserable flight experience, his plane crashes into a hillside after its engines malfunction mid-air. He is the only survivor, since he was the only passenger who followed proper safety precautions. After spending three days crawling to Albuquerque while carrying his heavy luggage, the narrator checks into a Holiday Inn, but a "big fat hermaphrodite with A Flock of Seagulls haircut and only one nostril" barges into his room, steals his prized snorkel, and, after a fight, flees.

The narrator vows to bring the thief to justice, but first decides to buy donuts. At the shop, he asks for many types of donuts and pastries, only to be told individually each one is sold out. He finally settles for a box of "one dozen starving, crazed weasels," which attack him. When running around town screaming for help, he meets a woman, Zelda; the two fall in love, marry, buy a house, and have two children named Nathaniel and Superfly, but eventually break up after Zelda asks him if he would like to join the Columbia Record Club, with the narrator claiming he is "just not ready for that kind of a commitment".

Soon, the narrator achieves his "lifelong dream": a part-time job at Sizzler. The job is eventful: the narrator earns employee of the month after putting out a grease fire with his face and cuts a co-worker's arms and legs off with a chainsaw. This event then reminds him of the time he bit a homeless man's jugular vein as a joke. The singer loses his train of thought, then circles back to say the entire point of the song was to relay his hatred of sauerkraut. The song ends with the message to the listener that, even during an existential crisis, they can still take solace in the existence of a "little place called Albuquerque".

== Recording and performance ==
At the end of the song (around 11:20, after the music ends), faint laughter can be heard in the background. As Yankovic says, "That's Jim West laughing—I thought it would be a good way to end the album. He's cracking up because of the stupid chord he played at the end of the song."

== Reception and live performance ==
Contrary to Yankovic's belief that the song would not be popular, it was one of the best-received songs from the album, and Yankovic incorporated the song as an encore to his tours. When performing this song live, Yankovic has been known to extend the song, by listing off more types of donuts, listing more names "Zelda" calls Yankovic, not telling the "amusing anecdote" at first, and even starting the song over completely after he "loses his train of thought." When performing this song live in Canada, Al is known to replace the dream job at Sizzler with one at Tim Hortons, a Canadian doughnut shop. During the guitar solo of the third chorus, Yankovic sometimes introduces West eagerly, but West plays "Mary Had a Little Lamb" instead of the real solo. Yankovic acts disappointed, and West walks away acting ashamed. As of his 2022 tour, Yankovic stops the song after using the word "hermaphrodite" to acknowledge that the word was now considered a slur and that the song was a product of an earlier, more ignorant time.

== Video ==
While a music video was never officially released, Flash animator Ryan Krzak, better known online as RWappin, would release an animated fanmade video called "Albuquerque: THE MOVIE" to Newgrounds on November 7, 2006. The video follows the plot of the song, with a character called Miracle Machine being the protagonist. RWappin also made an animation for "Everything You Know Is Wrong", another one of Yankovic's songs. In 2024, RWappin would make an official animation for Yankovic, animating the "Uptown Funk" segment of the video for "Polkamania".

== In other media ==
The 2004 video game Doom 3 contains a thin reference to the song—an email in one of the in-game PDAs mentions a character whose arms and legs were dismembered by the "Albuquerck Capacitor", therefore giving him the nickname "Torso Boy".

== Personnel ==
According to the liner notes of The Essential "Weird Al" Yankovic:

- "Weird Al" Yankovic – lead & background vocals, group vocals, hand claps
- Jim West – guitars, group vocals, hand claps
- Steve Jay – bass guitar, group vocals, hand claps
- Jon "Bermuda" Schwartz – drums, tambourine, group vocals, hand claps

== See also ==
- List of songs by "Weird Al" Yankovic
- The King of Rock 'n' Roll, another song sometimes known by this name.
