= The Essential "Weird Al" Yankovic =

Greatest hits album by "Weird Al" Yankovic
- Released: October 27, 2009
- Recorded: 1979–2006
- Genres: Comedy, parody
- Length: 76:43 (Disc 1); 76:31 (Disc 2); 29:01 (Disc 3)
- Labels: Volcano; Way Moby; Legacy
- Producers: Rick Derringer, "Weird Al" Yankovic

"Weird Al" Yankovic chronology
| Internet Leaks (2009) | The Essential "Weird Al" Yankovic (2009) | Alpocalypse (2011) |

Professional ratings
Review scores
| Source | Rating |
|---|---|
| Allmusic | 4.5/5 stars |
| Mojo | 4/5 stars |
| Paste | 8.8/10 |
| PopMatters | 9/10 stars |
| Under the Radar | 7/10 stars |

The Essential "Weird Al" Yankovic is a two-disc compilation album by the American parody musician "Weird Al" Yankovic. A limited edition "3.0" version of the album has a third disc. It is published by Sony Music's Legacy Recordings as part of their The Essential series. Yankovic selected the songs for inclusion on the album after seeking fan feedback for the choice between one of two polkas.

== Track listing ==
=== Disc 1 ===
| No. | Title | Writer(s) | Parody of | Length |
|---|---|---|---|---|
| 1. | "Another One Rides the Bus" (from Another One Rides the Bus (EP), 1981; later included on "Weird Al" Yankovic, 1983) | John Deacon; "Weird Al" Yankovic | "Another One Bites the Dust" by Queen | 2:40 |
| 2. | "Polkas on 45" (from "Weird Al" Yankovic in 3-D, 1984) | Various writers: Lew Brown; Wladimir Timm; Jaromir Vejvoda; Václav Zeman; Mark Mothersbaugh; Ritchie Blackmore; Ian Gillan; Roger Glover; Jon Lord; Ian Paice; John Crawford; Terri Nunn; David Diamond; John Lennon; Paul McCartney; Jim Morrison; Robby Krieger; Ray Manzarek; John Densmore; Doug Ingle; Billy Roberts; David Byrne; Chris Frantz; Jerry Harrison; Tina Weymouth; Lou Gramm; Mick Jones; Bob Calame; Frank Loesser; Lawrence Welk; Sting; Topper Headon; Mick Jones; Paul Simonon; Joe Strummer; Mick Jagger; Keith Richards; Bill Wyman; Pete Townshend; Yankovic | A polka medley including: "Beer Barrel Polka" by Jaromir Vejvoda; "Jocko Homo" by Devo; "Smoke on the Water" by Deep Purple; "Sex (I'm a ...)" by Berlin; "Hey Jude" by The Beatles; "L.A. Woman" by The Doors; "In-A-Gadda-Da-Vida" by Iron Butterfly; "Hey Joe" by The Jimi Hendrix Experience; "Burning Down the House" by Talking Heads; "Hot Blooded" by Foreigner; "Bubbles in the Wine" by Bob Calame (1913–1967), Lawrence Welk's long-standing theme song; "Every Breath You Take" by The Police; "Should I Stay or Should I Go" by The Clash; "Jumpin' Jack Flash" by The Rolling Stones; "My Generation" by The Who; "Ear Booker Polka" by "Weird Al" Yankovic | 4:23 |
| 3. | "Eat It" (from "Weird Al" Yankovic in 3-D) | Michael Jackson; Yankovic | "Beat It" by Michael Jackson | 3:21 |
| 4. | "I Lost on Jeopardy" (from "Weird Al" Yankovic in 3-D) | Greg Kihn; Steve Wright; Yankovic | "Jeopardy" by The Greg Kihn Band | 3:26 |
| 5. | "Yoda" (from Dare to Be Stupid, 1985) | Ray Davies; Yankovic | "Lola" by The Kinks | 3:58 |
| 6. | "One More Minute" (from Dare to Be Stupid) | Yankovic | Style parody of Elvis Presley-like doo-wop | 4:04 |
| 7. | "Like a Surgeon" (from Dare to Be Stupid) | Billy Steinberg; Tom Kelly; Yankovic | "Like a Virgin" by Madonna | 3:32 |
| 8. | "Dare to Be Stupid" (from Dare to Be Stupid) | Yankovic | Style parody of Devo | 3:25 |
| 9. | "Dog Eat Dog" (from Polka Party!, 1986) | Yankovic | Style parody of Talking Heads | 3:42 |
| 10. | "Lasagna" (from Even Worse, 1988) | Traditional, arr. by Ritchie Valens, Yankovic | "La Bamba" by Los Lobos and Ritchie Valens | 2:45 |
| 11. | "Melanie" (from Even Worse) | Yankovic | Original | 3:58 |
| 12. | "Fat" (from Even Worse) | Jackson; Yankovic | "Bad" by Michael Jackson | 3:37 |
| 13. | "UHF" (Single version) (from UHF – Original Motion Picture Soundtrack and Other Stuff, 1989) | Yankovic | Original | 3:49 |
| 14. | "The Biggest Ball of Twine in Minnesota" (from UHF – Original Motion Picture Soundtrack and Other Stuff) | Yankovic | Style parody of Harry Chapin and Gordon Lightfoot | 6:50 |
| 15. | "Trigger Happy" (from Off the Deep End, 1992) | Yankovic | Style parody of The Beach Boys and Jan & Dean | 3:46 |
| 16. | "Smells Like Nirvana" (from Off the Deep End) | Kurt Cobain; Dave Grohl; Krist Novoselic; Yankovic | "Smells Like Teen Spirit" by Nirvana | 3:42 |
| 17. | "You Don't Love Me Anymore" (from Off the Deep End) | Yankovic | Original | 4:01 |
| 18. | "Bedrock Anthem" (from Alapalooza, 1993) | Anthony Kiedis; John Frusciante; Flea; Chad Smith; Yankovic | "Under the Bridge" and "Give It Away" by Red Hot Chili Peppers | 3:43 |
| 19. | "Frank's 2000" TV" (from Alapalooza) | Yankovic | Style parody of R.E.M.'s early work | 4:07 |
| 20. | "Jurassic Park" (from Alapalooza) | Jimmy Webb; Yankovic | "MacArthur Park" by Richard Harris | 3:55 |

=== Disc 2 ===
| No. | Title | Writer(s) | Parody of | Length |
|---|---|---|---|---|
| 1. | "Since You've Been Gone" (from Bad Hair Day, 1996) | Yankovic | Original a cappella song | 1:23 |
| 2. | "Amish Paradise" (from Bad Hair Day) | Coolio; Doug Rasheed; Larry Sanders; Stevie Wonder; Yankovic | "Gangsta's Paradise" by Coolio featuring L.V. | 3:21 |
| 3. | "Gump" (from Bad Hair Day) | Chris Ballew; Yankovic | "Lump" by The Presidents of the United States of America | 2:12 |
| 4. | "Everything You Know Is Wrong" (from Bad Hair Day) | Yankovic | Style parody of They Might Be Giants | 3:48 |
| 5. | "The Night Santa Went Crazy" (Extra gory version) (from "Amish Paradise" single, 1996; original version from Bad Hair Day) | Yankovic | Style Parody of "Black Gold" by Soul Asylum | 4:03 |
| 6. | "Your Horoscope for Today" (from Running with Scissors, 1999) | Yankovic | Style parody of Third Wave Ska | 3:59 |
| 7. | "It's All About the Pentiums" (from Running with Scissors) | Sean Combs; Stephen Jacobs; Jason Phillips; Danny Styles; Christopher Wallace; Kimberly Jones; Deric Angelettie; Yankovic | "It's All About the Benjamins (Rock remix)" by Puff Daddy | 3:34 |
| 8. | "The Saga Begins" (from Running with Scissors) | Don McLean; Yankovic | "American Pie" by Don McLean | 5:28 |
| 9. | "Albuquerque" (from Running with Scissors) | Yankovic | Style parody of The Rugburns | 11:21 |
| 10. | "eBay" (from Poodle Hat, 2003) | Andreas Carlsson; Max Martin; Yankovic | "I Want It That Way" by the Backstreet Boys | 3:37 |
| 11. | "Bob" (from Poodle Hat) | Yankovic | Style parody of Bob Dylan | 2:29 |
| 12. | "Hardware Store" (from Poodle Hat) | Yankovic | Original | 3:43 |
| 13. | "I'll Sue Ya" (from Straight Outta Lynwood, 2006) | Yankovic | Style parody of Rage Against the Machine | 3:51 |
| 14. | "Canadian Idiot" (from Straight Outta Lynwood) | Billie Joe Armstrong; Yankovic | "American Idiot" by Green Day | 2:24 |
| 15. | "Pancreas" (from Straight Outta Lynwood) | Yankovic | Style parody of Brian Wilson | 3:48 |
| 16. | "Don't Download This Song" (from Straight Outta Lynwood) | Yankovic | Style parody of 1980s charity songs | 3:52 |
| 17. | "White & Nerdy" (from Straight Outta Lynwood) | Hakeem Seriki; Juan and Oscar Salinas; Anthony Henderson; Yankovic | "Ridin'" by Chamillionaire featuring Krayzie Bone | 2:52 |
| 18. | "Trapped in the Drive-Thru" (from Straight Outta Lynwood) | Robert Kelly; Jimmy Page; Robert Plant; John Paul Jones; Yankovic | Trapped in the Closet by R. Kelly; contains interpolation of "Black Dog" by Led Zeppelin | 10:51 |

=== Disc 3 (3.0 version only) ===
| No. | Title | Writer(s) | Parody of | Length |
|---|---|---|---|---|
| 1. | "Ricky" (from "Weird Al" Yankovic) | Mike Chapman; Nicky Chinn; Yankovic | "Mickey" by Toni Basil | 2:37 |
| 2. | "Midnight Star" (from "Weird Al" Yankovic in 3-D) | Yankovic | Original | 4:35 |
| 3. | "Living with a Hernia" (from Polka Party!) | Dan Hartman; Charlie Midnight; Yankovic | "Living in America" by James Brown | 3:20 |
| 4. | "Good Old Days" (from Even Worse) | Yankovic | Style parody of James Taylor | 3:20 |
| 5. | "Wanna B Ur Lovr" (from Poodle Hat) | Yankovic | Style parody of Beck | 6:14 |
| 6. | "Genius in France" (from Poodle Hat) | Yankovic | Style parody of Frank Zappa | 8:58 |

== Charts ==
Chart performance for The Essential "Weird Al" Yankovic
| Chart (2011) | Peak position |
|---|---|
| Australian Albums (ARIA) | 45 |
| US Billboard 200 | 178 |
| US Top Comedy Albums (Billboard) | 1 |
