= Doogtoons =

Animation Production studio

Doogtoons Studios
- Website type: Humor
- Founded: 2001
- Headquarters: Santa Monica, California, U.S.
- Key people: Doug Bresler (Founder)
- Website: doogtoons.com
- Advertising: Banner ads
- Registration: Optional
- Current status: Active

Doogtoons is a production studio founded and headed by Doug Bresler, best known for its series of "animated celebrity interviews" on the internet. Bresler has been producing short films since 1993, but his cartoons only became widely known after they were released as podcasts beginning October 22, 2005. One of the pioneers of cartoon podcasting, Doogtoons has been featured in several publications, both online and in print, including The Washington Post, BusinessWeek Magazine, Animation Magazine, USA Today, Rolling Stone, and Entertainment Weekly, among others. Doogtoons's cartoons and shorts have also been featured and licensed by numerous television networks, including Cinemax, Fox Sports, Game Show Network, G4TV and G4 Canada.

== TV and web series ==
=== Nick and Haig ===
Doogtoons' first series of cartoons was entitled Nick and Haig and was created using actual voice clips of interviews Bresler had conducted in 2001 with some of his friends. Bresler said his initial intention was to create an animated horror movie, but needed to do something smaller first in order to practice and learn. Bresler then compiled hours upon hours of interviews with his friends, picked what he thought to be the best content, and began animating characters to go along with the dialogue.

"Nick and Haig - Episode" I originally premiered as a seven-minute short film at the UCSB Digital Film Festival on May 23, 2002, but was later cut down into smaller "episodes" for podcasting. In 2006, an episode from the show entitled "The Vice of Human Beans" won first prize in Bolt's "1 Minute Film Festival". This was the show's second award after winning "Best Animated Short" at the 2006 DIY Film Festival in Los Angeles. Later in the year, Bresler signed a deal with G4 television to air Nick and Haig episodes during the station's "Late Night Peep Show" segment starting in May.

=== Doogtoons Asks A Ninja ===
Doogtoons has created seven animated interviews with the "ninja" from Ask a Ninja (which have since received a "Best of the Web 2007" nod from Animation World Network).

=== In the Studio ===
In late 2006, Doogtoons launched their official animated talk show, In the Studio, with animated interviews featuring "Weird Al" Yankovic and comic Tommy Chong. In March 2008, one of the shorts of the series, "Al's Childhood", was awarded Best Animated Video of 2007 by Yahoo.com.

Doogtoons began releasing new animated interviews in August 2010, the first featuring comedian and actor Harland Williams.

=== Eli's Dirty Jokes ===
In late 2006, Doug Bresler signed on with GoPotato.tv to animate and direct a show for their website. Eli's Dirty Jokes, a short-form series of animated adult-themed jokes told by an elderly real-life accountant, was released on YouTube.

In November 2008, Eli's Dirty Jokes was picked up by HBO for exclusive episodes to be broadcast on their Cinemax cable TV network. The first episode of the weekly show premiered November 8, 2008 preceding the network's premiere of Juno (film). The series is the first original internet show ever to be picked up by HBO and broadcast on any of their TV networks.

In March 2010, Eli's Dirty Jokes was nominated for "Best Animated Web Series" by the International Academy of Web Television at the 2010 Streamy Awards.

=== Stonetown ===
In 2012, Bresler signed on with the Kottonmouth Kings to animate Stonetown, a web series based on cartoon characters designed by D-Loc, one of the band's MCs. The series premiered on YouTube on April 20, 2012.

=== Fight Stories with Urijah Faber ===
In August 2013, Bresler signed on with FOX Sports to direct Fight Stories with Urijah Faber, an animated web series hosted by Urijah Faber. The first episode stars comedian Brian Whittaker and the second features comedian Daryl Wright.

On May 13, 2015, Fox Sports premiered the original 2 episodes of "Fight Stories" along with 3 brand new episodes featuring Josh Wolf, Skylar Astin and Mario Lopez in a half-half hour TV special on Fox Sports 1.

== Short films ==
=== Fredex: The Secret Lives of Robots ===
In 2006, Doogtoons contributed a 10-second animated segment to Channel Frederator's compilation short, Fredex: The Secret Lives of Robots, which won Best Internet Film at the 2007 Platform International Animation Festival in Portland, Oregon.

=== Holding for Miss Kiley ===
In August 2009, Doogtoons teamed up with Jonathan Katz to animate a short sketch for his podcast show, Hey, We're Back!.

=== It Getteth Better ===
In October 2011, Doogtoons created an animated featurette for the book The Last Testament: A Memoir, written by David Javerbaum. The video was titled "It Getteth Better".

== Music videos ==
=== Denny Blaze - Average Homeboy Returns ===
Doogtoons' first music video, produced in 2006, features self-proclaimed "Average Homeboy" Denny Blaze.

=== "Weird Al" Yankovic - Trapped in the Drive-Thru ===
In March 2007, Doug Bresler produced and directed a music video for "Weird Al" Yankovic for his track, Trapped in the Drive-Thru. Doogtoons was awarded a gold record for their contribution to Straight Outta Lynwood. The video was also featured as Channel Frederator's 100th episode. In June 2008, Trapped received the award of Funniest Film of 2007 at the Channel Frederator Awards.

=== Dan May - I Got A Gun ===
In September 2012, Doogtoons released a music video for Philadelphia-based singer/songwriter Dan May. I Got A Gun features a comedic spin on the classic fairy tales "The Three Little Pigs" and "Jack and the Beanstalk".

=== Dirtball and X - Robbery ===
In April 2013, Doogtoons released a live-action music video featuring The Dirtball and Daddy X of the Kottonmouth Kings.

=== L.B. Rayne ===
==== Indiana Jones (The Rejected Pop Music Video) ====
In July 2008, Doogtoons released a retro song and music video for pop star Laurence Butler Rayne entitled "Indiana Jones". The video, said to be made in the winter of 1984, features the purported "lost theme song" to Indiana Jones and the Temple of Doom.

==== Skywalking (The Rejected Star Wars Music Video) ====
L.B. Rayne's second video, Skywalking, was released October 31, 2009. Said to be produced in 1980, it is being touted as a lost love ballad intended for the soundtrack of The Empire Strikes Back. It is portrayed ironically as a love ballad between Luke Skywalker and Princess Leia, who would be retconned as siblings in 1983's Return of the Jedi.

==== The Groove Grid (The Rejected TRON Music Video) ====
L.B. Rayne's The Groove Grid was released December 29, 2010. It has been advertised as the lost theme song to the 1982 science fiction epic Tron.

==== Where No Man's Been Before (The Rejected Star Trek Music Video) ====
In April 2013, Doogtoons released yet another L.B. Rayne "lost classic" which is said to be the lost theme song to Star Trek II: The Wrath of Khan. The video features "Weird Al" Yankovic as a guitar-shredding Klingon as well as cameos from numerous YouTube personalities including Taryn Southern, Jessica Lizama and Nikki Limo.

==== Nightmare on L.B. Street (The Rejected Nightmare on Elm Street Music Video ====
In October 2013, Doogtoons released L.B. Rayne's lost theme song to "A Nightmare on Elm Street".

==== Terminate Our Love (The Rejected Terminator Music Video) ====
In June 2015, Doogtoons released a L.B. Rayne music video, "Terminate Our Love", the rejected theme song for James Cameron's 1984 sci-fi film The Terminator. The video features Morgan Larson as Sarah Connor and Trevor Algatt as the Terminator, along with other reoccurring L.B. Rayne cast members.

== Awards and nominations ==
Year	Award	Category	Work	Outcome
2006	DIY Film Festival	Best Animated Short	Nick and Haig	Won
2006	Bolt 1-Minute Film Festival	Best Comedy Short	Nick and Haig	Won
2006	Yahoo! Pick of May 2006	Best Website	Doogtoons.com	Won
2006	DIY Film Festival	Best Comedy Short	Nick and Haig	Won
2007	Tilzy.tv	Top 10 Holiday Videos	A Very Ninja Christmas	Won
2007	Revver.com	1 Millionth Dollar Received	Doogtoons.com	Won
2007	Animation World Network	Best of the Web	Doogtoons Ask A Ninja	Won
2007	RIAA	Gold Record	Trapped in the Drive-Thru	Won
2008	Yahoo! Video Awards	Best Animated Video	Weird Al's Childhood	Won
2008	Channel Frederator Awards	Funniest Film	Trapped in the Drive-Thru	Won
2010	Streamy Awards	Best Animated Web Series	Eli's Dirty Jokes	Nominated

== List of shorts ==
=== Nick and Haig episodes ===
Episode	Title	Released
1	Introductions	October 22, 2005
2	Haig's Childhood	October 29, 2005
3	Nick's Childhood	November 5, 2005
4	Being Your Age	November 18, 2005
5	Join Arnold	November 19, 2005
6	Favorite Color	November 26, 2005
7	Chihuahua	December 3, 2005
8	Chicken Heist	December 10, 2005
9	Creative Holidays	December 17, 2005
10	The Vice of Human Beans	December 24, 2005
11	Episode II Preview	December 24, 2005
12	Kid's Commercials	December 31, 2005
13	New York Story	January 7, 2006
14	High School	February 17, 2006

=== Doogtoons Asks a Ninja ===
Episode	Title	Released
1	Introductions	April 12, 2006
2	Being a Ninja	May 4, 2006
3	Ninja Knowledge	May 16, 2006
4	Ninjas and the Matrix	May 31, 2006
5	The Truth About Darth Vader	July 28, 2006
6	A Very Ninja Christmas Part I	December 14, 2007
7	A Very Ninja Christmas Part II	December 23, 2007

=== In the Studio ===
Episode	Title	Released
1	"Weird Al" Yankovic - Al's Childhood	October 12, 2006
2	"Weird Al" Yankovic - Spelling Bees and Accordions	August 23, 2007
3	Harland Williams - Career Choices	August 16, 2010
4	"Weird Al" Yankovic - School Crushes	November 5, 2010
5	"Weird Al" Yankovic - The Mystery of Meat	May 16, 2014
6	"Weird Al" Yankovic - Scariest Fan Encounter	February 22, 2015

=== Video Game Life ===
Episode	Title	Released
1	James Rolfe's Endless Nightmare: The Video Game	May 20, 2013
2	Harland Williams's Fallopio: The Video Game	June 3, 2013
3	Smosh's Smoshlevania: The Video Game	January 17, 2014
4	L.A. Freeway: The Video Game	September 15, 2021

=== Eli's Dirty Jokes ===
Episode	Title	Released
1	Five Birds	February 1, 2007
2	BBQ Booty	February 6, 2007
3	Moose Hunting	February 12, 2007
4	Rawr	February 16, 2007
5	Nice to Meet You	February 24, 2007
6	Piano Man	March 5, 2007
7	The Farmer's Daughters	April 2, 2007
8	Track Team	April 16, 2007
9	Monkey Love	June 8, 2007
10	Hoshimota	August 10, 2007
11	The Shepherd and His Boy	October 9, 2007
12	Loving Remembrance	November 27, 2007
13	The Three Fugitives	February 6, 2008
14	Recovery Roses	March 10, 2008
15	The Key to the Bedroom	April 8, 2008
16	Arabian Justice	July 8, 2008
17	The Sloppy Drunk	November 7, 2008
18	Peanut Ear	January 20, 2009
19	Nosy Neighbor	January 27, 2009
20	Yukon Ho!	February 3, 2009
21	Ugly Baby	February 10, 2009
22	Sunset Island	February 17, 2009
23	Bedroom Burglar	February 27, 2009
24	Prime Mates	March 6, 2009
25	Face-lifted Spirit	March 14, 2009
26	Son of a Beech	March 20, 2009
27	Drunk's Drycleaning	March 27, 2009
28	Naming Psychiatry	April 5, 2009
29	Wild Ski Trip	April 11, 2009
30	Lucky Leprechaun	April 19, 2009
31	Whale of a Good Time	April 25, 2009
32	Hot Mic	May 9, 2009
33	Costume Party	May 30, 2009
34	Pirate Barrel	June 21, 2009
35	Cougar Hunting	July 25, 2009
36	Health Hazard	August 8, 2009
37	Ladies Night	August 27, 2009
38	Schedule Conflict	September 12, 2009
39	Genie in a Bottle	September 21, 2009
40	Gator Boots	October 28, 2009
41	Holiday Special!	December 12, 2009
42	Father and Son	June 18, 2010
43	Funky Flatulence	October 7, 2010
44	What'd He Say?	January 14, 2011
45	Serious Situation	October 11, 2011
46	Switchblade Girlfriend	March 25, 2015
47	Badass Mice	March 25, 2015
48	Down By the Docks	March 25, 2015
49	Talking Dog for Sale	March 25, 2015
50	The Donation Station	March 25, 2015
51	Rocktopus	March 25, 2015
52	The Elephant and the Ant	March 25, 2015
53	Wedding Night Woes	March 25, 2015
54	Burning Lover	March 25, 2015
55	A Bedroom Pickle	March 25, 2015

=== Stonetown ===
Episode	Title	Released
1	Pilot	April 20, 2012
2	Pot in Space	May 20, 2012
3	Stonetown Buds	June 20, 2012
4	Super Sonic	July 20, 2012
5	Stuperheros	August 20, 2012
6	Prelude to Pot	September 20, 2012
7a	Field of Dreams	October 1, 2012
7b	Field of Screams	November 5, 2012
8	The Late Great Date	December 20, 2012
8.5	Happy Holidays	December 24, 2012
9	The Late Great Date Part II	February 22, 2013
10	The Late Great Date Part III	June 20, 2013
11	The Big Shebang	Oct 1, 2013

=== Doogtoons Quickies ===
Episode	Title	Released
1	Game of Thrones	June 6, 2013
2	Privacy	June 11, 2013
3	PS4 VS. XBOX ONE VS. WII U	June 13, 2013
4	Man of Steel	June 15, 2013
5	Kim Kardashian's Baby	June 17, 2013
6	First Dates	June 18, 2013
7	Paula Deen	June 25, 2013
8	Santa Intervention	December 24, 2013
9	System Updates	January 24, 2014
10	The Choice	February 4, 2014
11	What the Hell Did You Eat?	February 11, 2014
12	Game of Thrones Personality Quiz	February 18, 2014
13	7 Big Birthdays	March 4, 2014
14	Super Teenage Mario	March 27, 2014
15	The New iPhone 6!!	September 8, 2014
16	The Fappening Continues!!	September 22, 2014
17	Disturbing YouTube Thumbnails!!	October 24, 2014
18	The Force Awakens!!	November 13, 2014
19	Stupid Star Wars Rumors	December 10, 2015

=== Fight Stories with Urijah Faber ===
Episode	Title	Guest	Released
1	The Black Belt	Brian Whitaker	August 19, 2013
2	The Mets Jacket	Daryl Wright	December 10, 2013
3	The Hot Girlfriend	Josh Wolf	May 13, 2015
4	The Party Crashers	Skylar Astin	May 13, 2015
5	Trouble in Sayulita	Mario Lopez	May 13, 2015

=== Todd's Blog ===
Episode	Title	Released
1	SchwarZenatoR Nightmares!!	August 5, 2014
2	Comments Galore!!	August 19, 2014
3	Epic ALS Ice Bucket Challenge FAIL	August 19, 2014
4	The Maze Runner - Cast Interview!!	September 10, 2014
5	Maze Runner Comments!!	October 7, 2014
6	Jurassic World Trailer!!	November 23, 2014
7	IMPRESS ME Cast Interview	March 12, 2015

=== Todd and Stanley ===
Episode	Title	Released
1	Star Wars: The Ass Jedi!!	July 26, 2017

=== Music videos ===
Artist	Title	Released
Denny Blaze	Average Homeboy Returns	June 11, 2006
"Weird Al" Yankovic	Trapped in the Drive-Thru	March 19, 2007
L.B. Rayne	Indiana Jones (Theme Song)	July 17, 2008
L.B. Rayne	Skywalking	October 31, 2009
L.B. Rayne	The Groove Grid	December 29, 2010
Dan May	I Got A Gun	September 5, 2012
The Dirtball	Robbery	April 26, 2013
L.B. Rayne	Where No Man's Been Before	April 30, 2013
L.B. Rayne	Nightmare on L.B. Street	October 22, 2013
Joe Bresler	Driving Home from Max's	June 17, 2014
L.B. Rayne	Terminate Our Love	June 25, 2015
Kottonmouth Kings	Kronitron	September 18, 2015

=== Other collaborations ===
Collaborator	Title	Contribution	Released
The Consultant	Big Nate	Music	2010
Game Show Network	Photo Bomb!	Motion Graphics / Game Board	2014
Game Show Network	#Gameshow	Animation	2014
Steam Room Stories	Ball Slip	Animation	2014
Goldentusk	Super Mario Bros. Theme Song	Animation	2015
Field Day / Swoozie	2 Tinder Stories You Just Won't Believe	Animation	2015
YouTube Red Originals	Paranormal Action Squad - Season 1	Animation Director	2016
Ben Giroux	Back to the 90s	Animation	2017

=== Other shorts ===
Client/Distributor	Title	Released
Channel Frederator	Fredex - The Secret Lives of Robots	December 6, 2006
Jonathan Katz	Holding for Miss Kiley	August 8, 2009
Simon & Schuster	It Getteth Better	October 20, 2011
Canon, Inc.	Sweet Dreams	August 12, 2014
Machinima	Leaked Lightsaber Scene - Star Wars Episode VII	December 20, 2014
