= Living with a Hernia =

1986 single by "Weird Al" Yankovic

Single by "Weird Al" Yankovic

from the album Polka Party!
- B-side: "Don't Wear Those Shoes"
- Released: October 21, 1986
- Recorded: August 4, 1986
- Genre: Comedy; parody; funk
- Length: 3:16
- Label: Scotti Brothers
- Songwriters: Dan Hartman; Charlie Midnight; "Weird Al" Yankovic
- Producer: Rick Derringer

"Weird Al" Yankovic singles chronology
"Dare to Be Stupid" (1986)	"Living with a Hernia" (1986)	"Christmas at Ground Zero" (1986)

Music video
- "Living with a Hernia" on YouTube

"Living with a Hernia" is a song by "Weird Al" Yankovic. The song is a parody of "Living in America" by James Brown, from the film Rocky IV. The song mostly describes the terrible "aggravation" and "back pain" that a hernia causes. The narrator himself claims to be suffering from a hernia, and that he's "Got to have an operation".

== Recording ==
"Living with a Hernia" is a spoof of "Living in America" by Dan Hartman and Charlie Midnight (which was also the theme to the 1985 film Rocky IV). As the title suggests, it is about hernias. When it came time to pick a song to parody as the lead single for Polka Party! Scotti Brothers Records "had some very strong ideas" and wished to have Yankovic parody a musician who was signed on the same label. After "Living in America" became a hit, the record label insisted that Yankovic parody the song, to which Yankovic obliged. In order to accurately write the song, Yankovic researched the various types of hernias. On August 4, 1986, Yankovic began recording parodies for Polka Party! starting with "Living With a Hernia".

== Critical reception ==
The single received mostly mixed reviews. In a review just after release, Keith Thomas of The Atlanta Journal-Constitution called the single "a comical classic", praising Yankovic's lampooning of Brown's stage performance. He was particularly pleased with Yankovic naming specific types of hernias as opposed to cities in the United States. He concluded that, "Some people say Weird Al's appeal will wear out [but] I beg to differ."

While reviewing it fifteen years after release, Eugene Chadbourne of AllMusic was critical of the parody, and wrote that "'Living in America' in its original version has all the overblown grandeur needed to make a good parody target, but 'Living With a Hernia' just isn't funny." Christopher Thelen of the Daily Vault noted in 2001 that "Yankovic even falls flat tackling" Brown with this parody.

== Music video ==
Yankovic noted that "it was a real thrill to do James Brown. I'm a total non-dancer, never went to any dances in high school, but if I analytically dissect a dance routine I can figure it out." Choreographer Chester Whitmore was hired to accurately create the dance scenes featured in the video, which was shot on the concert set used in the movie Rocky IV.

== Track listing ==
1. "Living with a Hernia" – 3:16
2. "Don't Wear Those Shoes" – 3:35

== Personnel ==
According to the liner notes of the 3.0 version of The Essential "Weird Al" Yankovic:

- "Weird Al" Yankovic – lead vocal and background vocals
- Steve Jay – bass guitar
- Jon "Bermuda" Schwartz – drums, drum programming
- Pat Regan – keyboards
- Warren Luening – trumpet
- Bill Anderson – tenor saxophone

== See also ==
- List of singles by "Weird Al" Yankovic
- List of songs by "Weird Al" Yankovic
