= Bad Time =

Bad Time may refer to:

- "Bad Time" (Grand Funk song), 1975
- "Bad Time" (Alkaline Trio song), 2023
- "Bad Time" (Lil Tecca song), 2024
- "Bad Time" by Sabrina Carpenter from Singular: Act I, 2018

== See also ==
- Bad Times, a computer virus hoax
