= Goodtimes virus =

Internet hoax

The Goodtimes virus, also styled as Good Times virus, was a computer virus hoax that spread during the early years of the Internet's popularity. Warnings about a computer virus named "Good Times" began being passed around among Internet users in 1994. The Goodtimes virus was supposedly transmitted via an email bearing the subject header "Good Times" or "Goodtimes", hence the virus's name, and the warning recommended deleting any such email unread. The virus described in the warnings did not exist, but the warnings themselves were, in effect, virus-like. In 1997 the Cult of the Dead Cow hacker collective announced that they had been responsible for the perpetration of the "Good Times" virus hoax as an exercise to "prove the gullibility of self-proclaimed 'experts' on the Internet".

== History ==
The first recorded email warnings about the Good Times virus showed up on 15 November 1994. The first message was brief, a simple five sentence email with a Christmas greeting, advising recipients not to open email messages with the subject "GOOD TIMES!!", as doing so would "ruin" their files. Later messages became more intricate. The most common versions—the "Infinite loop" and "ASCII buffer" editions—were much longer, containing descriptions of what exactly Good Times would do to the computer of someone who opened it, as well as comparisons to other viruses of the time, and references to a U.S. Federal Communications Commission warning. The warning emails themselves usually contained the very subject line warned against.

== Sample email ==
FYI, a file, going under the name "Good Times" is being sent to some Internet users who subscribe to on-line services (Compuserve, Prodigy and America On Line). If you should receive this file, do not download it! Delete it immediately. I understand that there is a virus included in that file, which if downloaded to your personal computer, will ruin all of your files.

== Purported effects ==
The longer version of the Good Times warning contained descriptions of what Good Times was supposedly capable of doing to computers. In addition to sending itself to every email address in a recipient's received or sent mail, the Good Times virus caused a wide variety of other effects. For example, one version said that if an infected computer contained a hard drive, it could be destroyed. If Good Times was not stopped in time, an infected computer would enter an "nth-complexity infinite binary loop" (a meaningless term), damaging the processor. The "ASCII" buffer email described the mechanism of Good Times as a buffer overflow.

== Hoaxes similar to Good Times ==
A number of computer virus hoaxes appeared after the Good Times hoax had begun to be widely shared. These messages were similar in form to Good Times, warning users not to open messages bearing particular subject lines. Subject lines mentioned in these emails include "Penpal greetings", "Free Money", "Deeyenda", "Invitation", and "Win a Holiday".

The Bad Times computer virus warning is generally considered to be a spoof of the Good Times warning.

== Viruses that function like Good Times ==
Developments in mail systems, such as Microsoft Outlook, without sufficient thought for security implications, made viruses that indeed propagate themselves via email possible. Notable examples include the Melissa worm, the ILOVEYOU virus, and the Anna Kournikova virus. In some cases, a user must open a document or program contained in an email message in order to spread the virus; in others, notably the Kak worm, merely opening or previewing an email message itself will trigger the virus.

Some e-mail viruses written after the Good Times scare contained text announcing that "This virus is called 'Good Times'", presumably hoping to gain kudos amongst other virus writers by appearing to have created a worldwide scare. In general, virus researchers avoided naming these viruses as "Good Times", but an obvious potential for confusion exists, and some anti-virus tools may well detect a real virus they identify as "Good Times", though this will not be the cause of the original scare.

== Spoofs ==
Weird Al Yankovic made a song parody of the virus titled "Virus Alert".

The Bad Times virus hoax was created years later.
