= More Guitar Stories =

Album by Jim West

More Guitar Stories is a studio album by guitarist Jim West. The album earned West a Grammy Award for Best New Age Album.

== Track list ==
Track listing adopted from Spotify:

All tracks are written by Jim "Kimo" West.

No.	Title	Length
1.	"Mele-Ahiani Evening Song"	5:31
2.	"Windward"	5:44
3.	"Birimintingo"	5:34
4.	"Paniolo Starlight"	4:26
5.	"Tin Roof Shing-a-Ling"	5:17
6.	"Moonbow"	4:44
7.	"Green Islands"	4:05
8.	"The Lydian Sea"	4:05
9.	"Sugar Cane Blues"	5:15
10.	"Soul Motion"	5:08

== Lineup ==
- Jim "Kimo" West - Guitars, percussion, orchestrations
- Jimmy Johnson - Fretless bass
- MB Gordy - Percussion
- Dan Lutz - Upright bass
- Simon Vitucci - Cello
- TJ T Roy - Tablas
- Cenk Erdogan - Fretless guitar

More Guitar Stories

Studio album by Jim West
- Released: August 14, 2020
- Genre: Slack-key guitar
- Label: Westernmost Music
