= Bad Times =

Computer virus hoax

Bad Times is a computer virus hoax sent out by e-mail. This "virus" does not actually exist, and the "warning" is meant to parody the alarmist message that spread the Goodtimes virus hoax.

The "Badtimes" email followed the principles of "Goodtimes", by warning of the horrible consequences that the alleged virus could inflict. However, "Badtimes" attempted to make itself implausible even to people unfamiliar with computers, although it started by claiming that the virus would wipe the victim's computer hard disk drive: implausible claims that "Badtimes" made included using subspace field harmonics to scratch any CDs that the victim attempted to play, drinking all the beer, and leaving dirty socks on the coffee table when the victim expected company. Some versions of "Badtimes" claimed that the virus replaced lunch meat with Spam, while making the victim's cologne and perfume smell like pickled cucumber.

It is unclear whether the "Badtimes" email can be classed as a joke or a hoax: in June 2006, Sophos acknowledged that "Badtimes" meant to parody virus hoax emails, but nevertheless advised against forwarding the joke email, in case the recipients misunderstood the threat to be real.

The hoax inspired a musical version, by the group Laika titled Badtimes off the album Good Looking Blues, where the lyricist Margaret Fielder recites the contents of one of the versions of the virus.

The "Weird Al" Yankovic song "Virus Alert" contains several similar claims in its lyrics.
