= Canadian Idiot =

2006 single by "Weird Al" Yankovic

- Australian promotional single cover

Promotional single by "Weird Al" Yankovic

from the album Straight Outta Lynwood
- Released: 26 September 2006
- Recorded: 19 February 2006
- Genre: Comedy rock; punk rock; pop punk
- Length: 2:23
- Label: Volcano
- Songwriters: "Weird Al" Yankovic; Green Day
- Producer: "Weird Al" Yankovic

"Weird Al" Yankovic singles chronology
"White & Nerdy" (2006)	"Canadian Idiot" (2006)	"Whatever You Like" (2008)

"Canadian Idiot" is a song by American parody musician "Weird Al" Yankovic, released on 26 September 2006 from his album Straight Outta Lynwood. It is a parody of Green Day's song "American Idiot".

The song is a sarcastic parody of the stereotypical American view of the Canadian way of life and a satire of American xenophobia. Yankovic pokes fun at an accentuated Canadian dialect and Canadians' love of ice hockey, beer, macaroni and cheese, and doughnuts. At the end of the song, he says that the Canadians are "up to something" and calls for a "preemptive strike".

Although critical reception to the song was mixed, "Canadian Idiot" is among Yankovic's best-charting songs, peaking at No. 82 on the Billboard Hot 100. He included it on the set lists of four of his concert tours, and fans responded with hundreds of homemade music videos.

== Composition and themes ==
"Canadian Idiot" is "Weird Al" Yankovic's parody of "American Idiot", a 2004 punk rock anthem by Green Day. While the original critiques American media, the parody mentions several common American stereotypes about Canadians, such as the perception Canadians love ice hockey, beer, doughnuts and macaroni and cheese. After ranting about Canadians being stupid and ridiculous, the singer mentions some of the country's positive attributes. However, believing Canadian over-politeness to be disingenuous and that Canadians are "up to something", the singer calls for a "preemptive strike" against Canada.

Yankovic has said the lyrics reflect the viewpoint of an ignorant American and that the song is "a love letter to Canada". Yankovic's time in Canada during his career, in particular at cable music channel MuchMusic, was such that he "felt like an honorary Canadian". While hoping that listeners understood the song is a joke, Yankovic was a bit worried about how "irony-impaired people" would receive it.

"Canadian Idiot"
The singer's admission of fear stands apart from his boisterous criticisms.

In Weird Al: Seriously, musicologist Lily Hirsch notes the lyrics reprimand Canadians for not being like Americans, and are an ironic look at American xenophobia. She notes the line in which the singer admits to being "nervous" about Canada, and how it stands apart from the rest of the song like "a radioed request for help".

Hirsch wrote that the parody had the same energy and drive as the original but its message was more veiled and some missed its irony. She quotes blogger Nathan Rabin: "'Canadian Idiot' is fundamentally about the way we demonize people who are not like us, even when those differences actually make them better than us, not worse." Illustrating this, Hirsch notes that, like Yankovic's 1992 song "Trigger Happy", "Canadian Idiot" satirizes gun culture in the United States. The singer disparages Canadians for not carrying firearms in public places but later refers to the country's low crime rates, "implying a relationship between gun ownership and crime".

Sociologist Shoshana Magnet notes the song's effective use of common but conflicting stereotypes, such as how it "mocks Canadian earnestness ... while paying homage to the continued Canadian commitment to the welfare state".

== Recording and release ==
"Canadian Idiot" is the first parody Yankovic recorded for Straight Outta Lynwood, with production beginning on 19 February 2006. The song was released with the album and as a digital single on 26 September 2006.

The song appeared on the Billboard charts despite not having a physical single in the US. It peaked at No. 82 on the Billboard Hot 100, No. 35 on Hot Digital Songs, and No. 57 on the Pop 100. Promotional single-CDs of "Canadian Idiot" were pressed in Australia and shipped for play on radio stations.

== Live performances ==
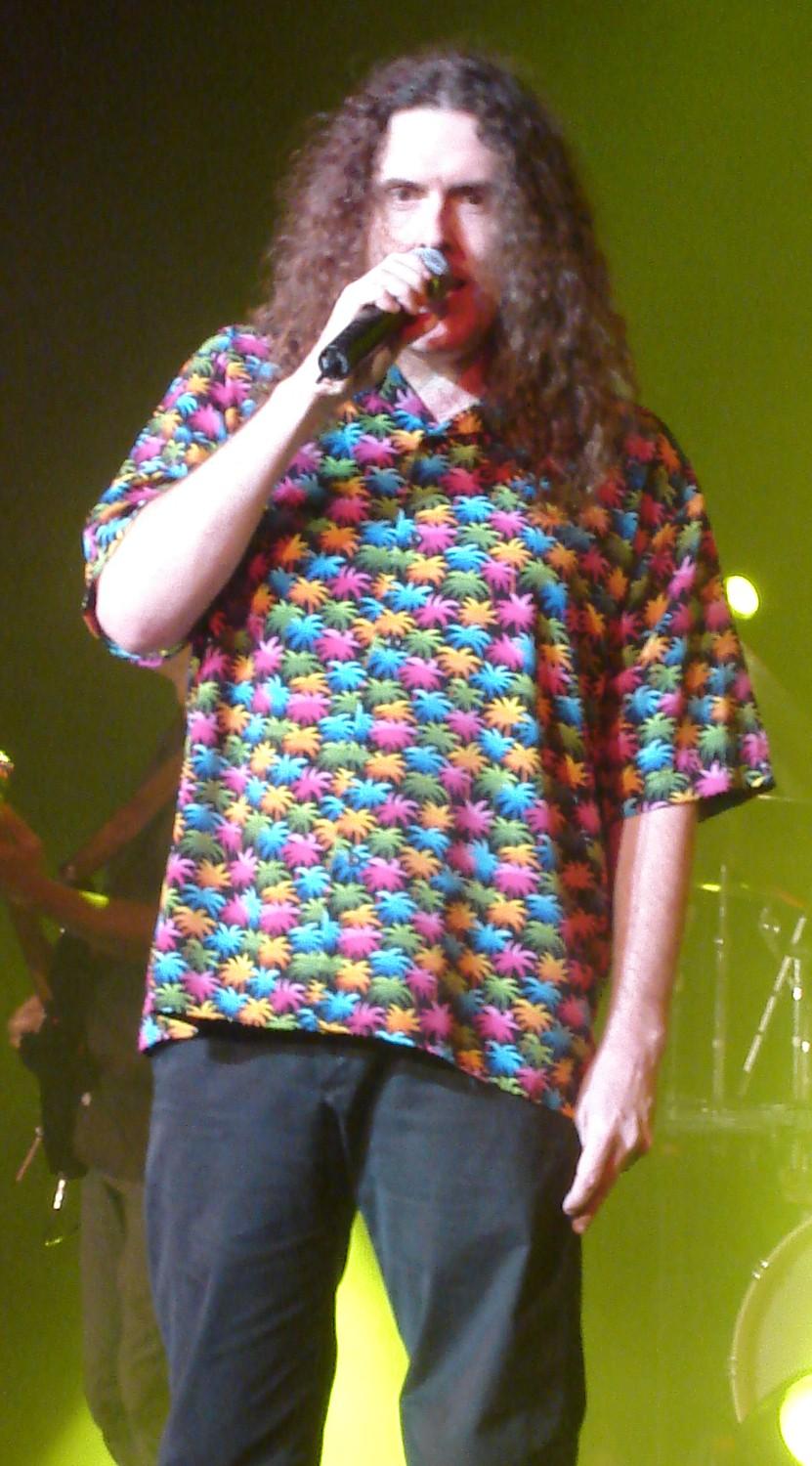
Yankovic performing during the Straight Outta Lynwood tour in 2007

"Canadian Idiot" was the second song performed on Yankovic's 2007–08 Straight Outta Lynwood concert tour, following a polka medley. In an interview with Rolling Stone, Yankovic said of the tracks on the album "Canadian Idiot" was "the most fun to perform live". Audience response was positive enough that he included the song on the set lists of three subsequent album tours.

During performances of the song on the Straight Outta Lynwood tour, Yankovic and his band wore black collared shirts and red ties, similar to that which Armstrong wore at American Idiot performances and promotions. On subsequent tour performances, Yankovic wore a red-and-white jacket patterned with maple leaves.

The first Canadian performance of the song was to 4,000 fans at the MTS Centre in Winnipeg, Manitoba, on 20 June 2007. Rob Williams of the Winnipeg Free Press wrote that the polka medley and "Canadian Idiot" were "the perfect way to start" his return to Canada and rated the concert 4 out of 5 stars. (Note: The MTS Centre concert was Yankovic's first regular tour performance in Canada in seven years. He explained that his absence from Canada on the Poodle Hat tour had been due to an unspecified contract dispute.) David Schmeichel of the Winnipeg Sun wrote that the song was received well, included the McKenzie Brothers' signature "Call of the Loon" as a chorus and concluded with an explosion of red and white streamers. After the song, Yankovic joked to the audience, "This is the first time we've played that in Canada so thanks for not killing us."

A performance of "Canadian Idiot" at Toronto's Massey Hall on 16 July 2011 is included in the concert video "Weird Al" Yankovic Live!: The Alpocalypse Tour. It aired on Comedy Central on 1 October 2011 and was released on Blu-ray and DVD by Paramount Home Entertainment later that month.

On 19 February 2013, Yankovic performed "Canadian Idiot" with independent artists Portugal. The Man to close a one-hour telethon-styled webcast announcing the lineup for the Bonnaroo Music Festival.

The song was included in a special free outdoor show of the Mandatory Fun tour on 21 July 2015 at Place des festivals in Montreal, Quebec, as part of the Just For Laughs comedy festival. (Note: Aside from a few songs played in 2011 while hosting a comedy show, this was Yankovic's first concert in Montreal since 1996.) Despite some early rain, attendance in the public square approached its capacity of 25,000.

== Reception ==
=== Fan-made music videos ===
Fans created homemade music videos, ranging from crude animation to choreographed lip-synchronization, embracing the song's bizarre imagery, which were posted on YouTube. Many of the young filmmakers were admittedly ignorant about Canada, and perhaps also of the song's irony, drawing criticism in YouTube's comment sections. At the end of 2006, the Toronto Star put the song on its "naughty list" for inviting "hundreds of young Americans [to create] Youtube videos" mocking Canada.

Canadian music channel MuchMusic ran a contest for the song, calling for entrants to submit a video of themselves being the "ultimate Canadian idiot". Five winning clips were to be shown on Much on Demand. Some time after the deadline of 27 December 2006, the contest was canceled because of a lack of submissions. Later, an update brought the project back, and the five finalists received digital cameras and a personalized recording from Yankovic.

=== Critical reception ===
Critical reception to the song was mixed. David Jeffries of AllMusic applauded "Canadian Idiot" as one of the better contributions on an "inspired" album. The Hamilton Spectator's Jeff Mahoney wrote that the song is a great parody and "a delicious shish kebab of Great White North cliches".

Chris Carle of IGN likened the parody to Yankovic giving Canada a spanking. A review in The New Yorker described the song as a repetitive "one-liner". Al Shipley of Stylus called the song a "toothless" send-up of tired Canadian stereotypes. Slate's Sam Anderson described the song as "formulaic and calculated" as if generated by a computer. Scott Shetler of Slant Magazine felt it had "predictable jokes" which had been done better on South Park with the satirical song "Blame Canada".

=== Chart performance ===
Chart (2006)	Peak position	Ref
U.S. Billboard Hot 100	82	
U.S. Billboard Pop 100	57	

== Personnel ==
Credits from the liner notes of The Essential "Weird Al" Yankovic:

- "Weird Al" Yankovic – lead & background vocals
- Jim West – guitars
- Steve Jay – bass guitar
- Jon "Bermuda" Schwartz – drums

== Legacy ==
At the 2007 NHL Western Conference Quarter Finals, fans of the Dallas Stars voted for "Canadian Idiot" to be played during the intermission of a game against the Vancouver Canucks. The Stars were eliminated.

In 2013 and 2017, Maclean's magazine included "Canadian Idiot" on lists of fictional stories about the beginning of a Canada–US war.

In 2014, (Note: Prior to the release of Mandatory Fun.) Billboard evaluated "Canadian Idiot" as Yankovic's 10th biggest hit, based on cumulative chart performance.

== See also ==
- Anti-Canadian sentiment
- Being Canadian – documentary which examines stereotypes of Canadians
- "Blame Canada"
- Canadian humour
- I Am Canadian
- Irony
- Ugly American (pejorative)
