= Virus Alert =

- The thumbnail of the song's animated music video

Song by "Weird Al" Yankovic

from the album Straight Outta Lynwood
- Released: September 26, 2006
- Recorded: July 5, 2005
- Genre: Comedy rock, pop rock
- Length: 3:46
- Label: Volcano
- Songwriter: "Weird Al" Yankovic
- Producer: "Weird Al" Yankovic

Virus Alert is a song by American musician "Weird Al" Yankovic from his twelfth studio album, Straight Outta Lynwood (2006). The song is a style parody of the band Sparks. The song serves as a satire of hoax malware warnings such as the Goodtimes virus hoax.

== Background and composition ==
"Virus Alert" is an original composition by Yankovic, written in the style of the band Sparks, particularly emulating their musical approach from the mid-1970s, known for its "hyperactive, keyboard-driven sound". Yankovic had long been a fan of the band and had previously included their song "This Town Ain't Big Enough for Both of Us" in his polka medleys.

Lyrically, the song satirizes the chain-like emails and virus hoaxes that were prevalent in the late 1990s and early 2000s. These emails often contained frantic warnings about fictional, absurdly destructive computer viruses and urged recipients to forward the message to everyone they knew. The song's frantic pace and over-the-top descriptions of the virus's effects parody the hyperbolic and panicked tone of these email warnings.

== Plot ==
The song is presented as a frantic, comedic warning about a fictional and absurdly destructive computer virus. Al urgently alerts listeners to be cautious of an email with the subject line "stinky cheese", insisting that it should never be opened under any circumstances. The lyrics humorously describe the virus's bizarre and exaggerated effects, ranging from translating documents into Swahili and freezing computer screens to neutering pets, recording unpopular movies on television, and even erasing Easter eggs from DVDs.

As the song progresses, the increasingly ridiculous consequences of the virus escalate to include giving poodles hickeys, investing money in dubious stocks, making prank calls, and causing clocks to reset. The narrator warns that it could inflict permanent wedgies, legally change victims' names, disrupt the pH balance of swimming pools, and make digital devices behave irrationally, such as playing only specific bands' music or telling knock-knock jokes during sleep.

The situation grows even more outlandish as the virus is said to steal identities, purchase warehouses of pink leotards, and create temporal anomalies littered with snack wrappers. The narrator repeatedly urges listeners to delete the message immediately and forward the warning to everyone they know. In its finale, the song recommends extreme measures like burying computers in deep holes and destroying any clothing worn while online to avoid infection, all while maintaining a frantic, exaggeratedly serious tone for comedic effect.

== Release and reception ==
"Virus Alert" was released on September 26, 2006, as a track on the album Straight Outta Lynwood. The album was a commercial success, debuting at number 10 on the Billboard 200 chart, which was Yankovic's highest chart debut at the time.

In a track-by-track review for MTV, Corey Moss described the song as a "hyperactive new wave tune" that lampoons "those e-mails your paranoid aunt sends you". AllMusic critic David Jeffries noted the track as an example of Yankovic's skill with style parodies, calling it a "dead-on" and "effervescent" take on Sparks.

== Music video ==
An animated music video for "Virus Alert" was directed by animator David C. Lovelace, known for his work on the website Newgrounds. The video was included on the DVD side of the DualDisc release of Straight Outta Lynwood, which featured animated videos for six of the album's original songs. The video visually interprets the song's increasingly absurd warnings with stylized, cartoonish depictions of the virus's destructive capabilities, animated in Lovelace's signature style.

== Virus Alert 3D ==
On May 6, 2007, Left Brain Games released a game called Virus Alert 3D, based on the song. In the game, Al must "delete" the viruses that have spread throughout the computer network of Company-Tech Co., Ltd., LCC, Al's new employer. In the game, Al is able to shoot discs by collecting them.

== Personnel ==
Credits adapted from the liner notes of Straight Outta Lynwood.

- "Weird Al" Yankovic – lead vocals, backing vocals, keyboards
- Jim West – guitar, keyboards, backing vocals
- Steve Jay – bass guitar, backing vocals
- Jon "Bermuda" Schwartz – drums, drum programming
