= Straight Outta Lynwood =

Studio album by "Weird Al" Yankovic
- Released: September 26, 2006
- Recorded: July 5, 2005 – July 22, 2006
- Studios: Mad Dog (Burbank); The Pass (Los Angeles); 4th Street Recording (Santa Monica); Westlake Audio (Los Angeles & West Hollywood)
- Genres: Comedy; parody
- Length: 47:45
- Labels: Volcano; Zomba; Way Moby
- Producer: "Weird Al" Yankovic

"Weird Al" Yankovic chronology
Poodle Hat (2003)	Straight Outta Lynwood (2006)	Internet Leaks (2009)

Singles from Straight Outta Lynwood
- 1. "Don't Download This Song" Released: August 21, 2006; 2. "White & Nerdy" Released: September 12, 2006; 3. "Canadian Idiot" Released: September 26, 2006

Straight Outta Lynwood is the twelfth studio album by the American parody musician "Weird Al" Yankovic, released on September 26, 2006, the title drawing inspiration from hip hop group N.W.A's Straight Outta Compton. It was the sixth studio album self-produced by Yankovic. The musical styles on the album are built around parodies and pastiches of pop and rock music of the mid-2000s. The album's lead single, "White & Nerdy", is a parody of Chamillionaire's hit single "Ridin' ". The single debuted at #28 on the Billboard Hot 100 and peaked at #9 the following week; "Canadian Idiot", a parody of Green Day's "American Idiot", also charted, peaking at #82.

The album contains three further parodies, based on "Confessions Part II" by Usher, "Do I Make You Proud" by Taylor Hicks, and Trapped in the Closet by R. Kelly. The other half of the album is original material, containing many "style parodies"—musical imitations of existing artists, such as Brian Wilson, Rage Against the Machine, Sparks, animated musical specials, Cake, and 1980s charity songs. Originally, there were plans for the album's lead single to have been a spoof of James Blunt's hit "You're Beautiful" entitled "You're Pitiful", but Blunt's record label, Atlantic, blocked the commercial release of the parody in spite of Blunt's approval.

In 2006, the album was released as both a digital download and as a DualDisc (a double-sided optical disc that contained a CD on one side and a DVD on the other) containing both the album and animated music videos for a number of the album's songs. Straight Outta Lynwood was met with mostly positive reviews: Many critics applauded "White & Nerdy" and "Trapped in the Drive-Thru", while some of the other parody songs were met with a more muted response. The album peaked at number 10 on the Billboard 200. "White & Nerdy" became Yankovic's highest-charting single as well as his first Platinum-certified single. The record itself was certified Gold for shipments of over 500,000 copies.

== Production ==
=== Originals ===
On July 5, 2005, recording for Straight Outta Lynwood officially began. By late 2005, six originals—"Pancreas", "Close but No Cigar", "Virus Alert", "Don't Download This Song", "I'll Sue Ya", and "Weasel Stomping Day"—had been recorded. "Weasel Stomping Day" describes, in the style of animated musical specials of the 1960s, a supposedly traditional holiday in which participants don Viking helmets, spread mayonnaise on their lawns, and "snap [the titular animals'] weasely spines in half." "I'll Sue Ya" is a Rage Against the Machine style parody, satirizing frivolous litigation. Yankovic chose to juxtapose the style of Rage Against the Machine with lyrics about lawsuits because he felt that humor could be derived by pairing the anger of the band's music with a topic so vacuous. "Don't Download This Song", a style parody of 1980s charity songs, such as "We are the World", "Hands Across America", and "Do They Know It's Christmas?", "describes the perils of online music file-sharing". According to Yankovic himself, the song takes a moderate approach to the peer-to-peer music download situation, arguing that both sides—people trying to illegally download music and the Recording Industry Association of America (RIAA)—can act hypocritically depending on the situation.

"Virus Alert" is a style parody of Sparks, specifically their work in the mid-1970s, such as their album Kimono My House (1974). It details "the evil that lurks in your email inbox." "Close but No Cigar" is a style parody of Cake that tells the story of a man who breaks up with his seemingly perfect girlfriends due to the most inconsequential of flaws. The track was inspired by an actual friend of Yankovic's who was never satisfied with any of his dates; Yankovic later explained that "the song was inspired by [the] attitude, that nothing could ever be good enough." The final original recorded, "Pancreas", is a song mainly about the biological functions of the aforementioned organ. The song is an imitation of the musical stylings of Brian Wilson, specifically his work found on the 1966 album Pet Sounds, released by the Beach Boys, and their aborted follow-up album, Smile (the latter of which was released by Wilson as a solo record in 2004). Yankovic joked that the reason the song was written was because "my pancreas has given so much to me over the years, I felt like I needed to give something back to it".

=== Parodies and polka ===
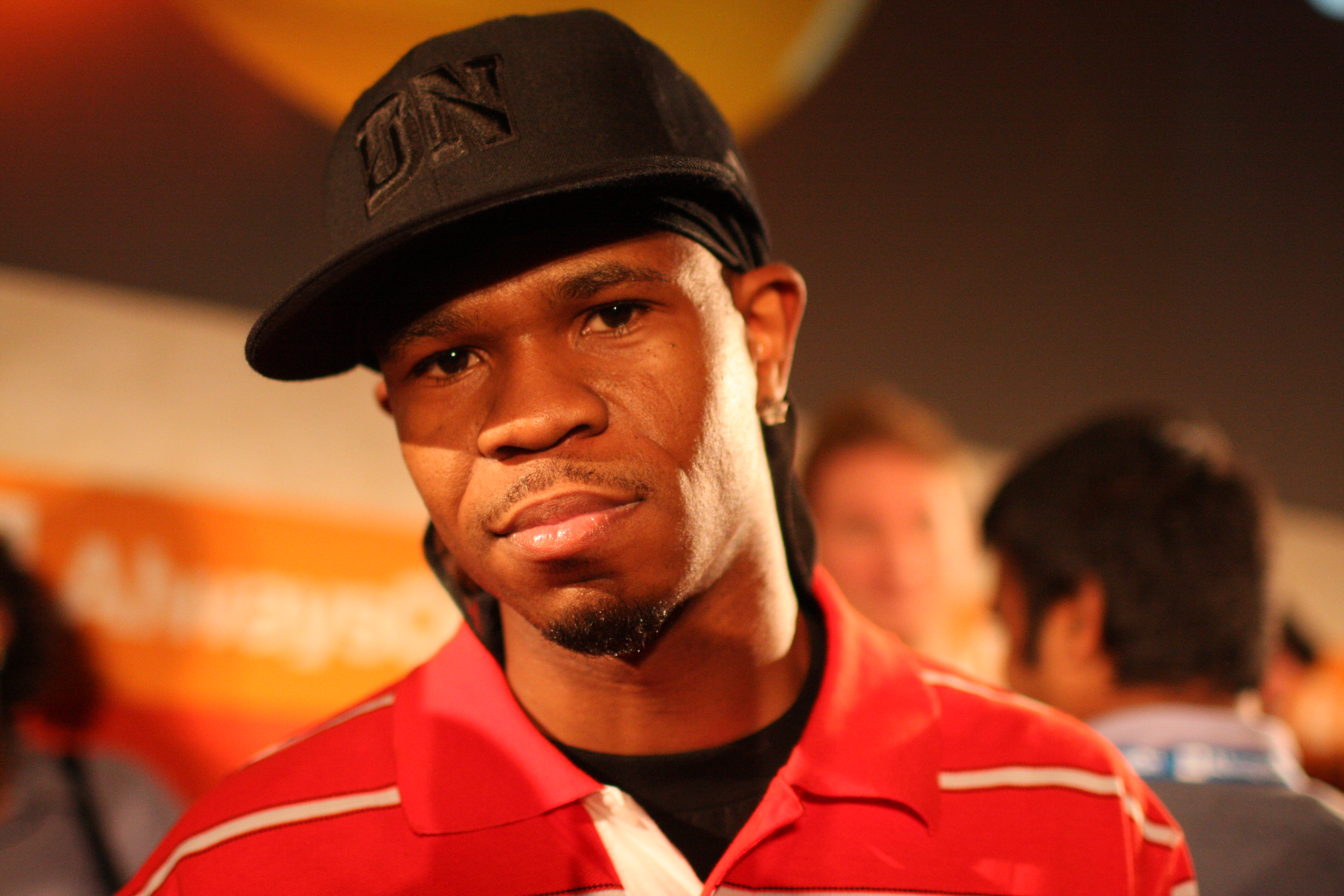
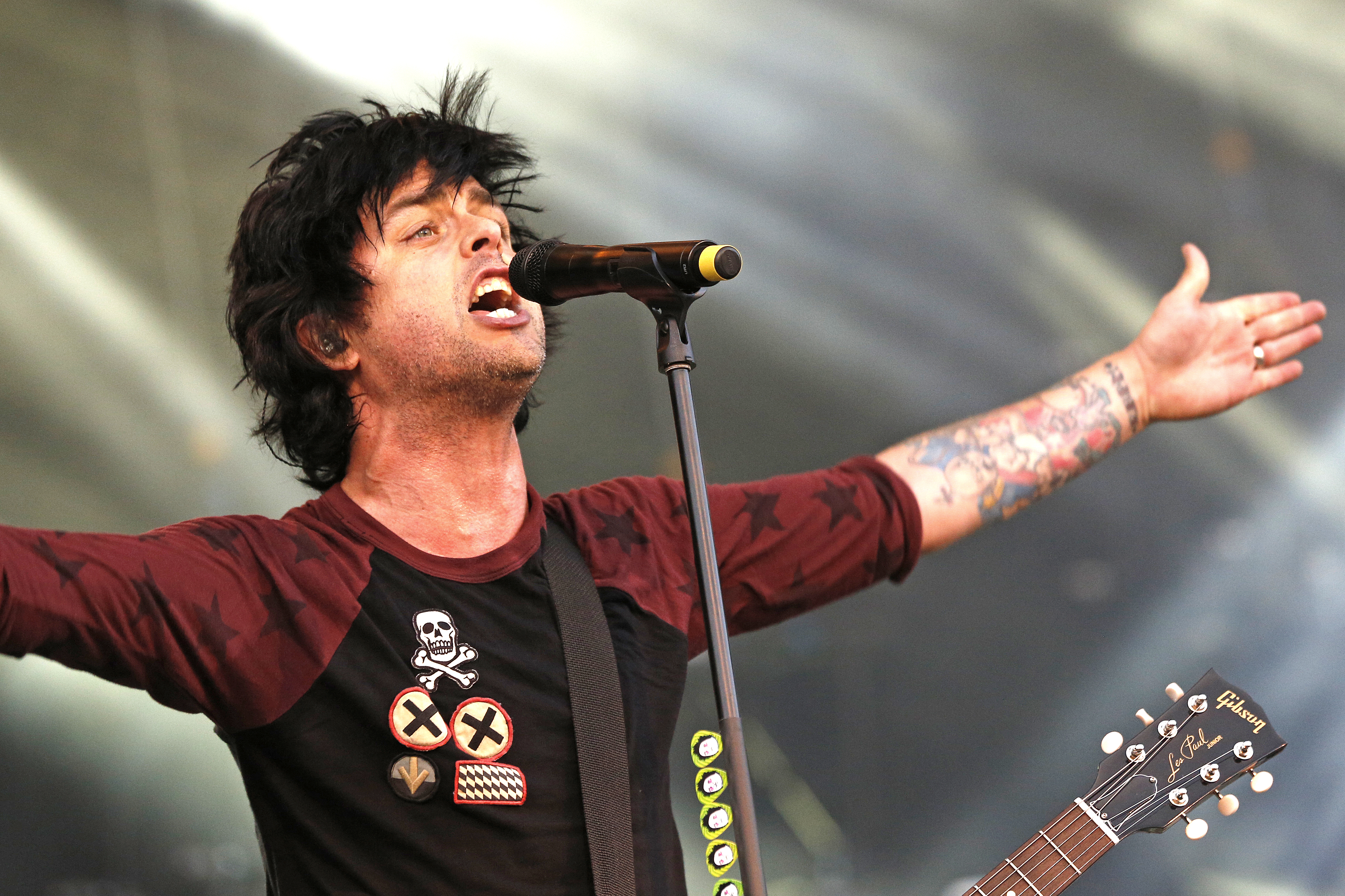
The album contains parodies of Chamillionaire (left) and Green Day (right, Billie Joe Armstrong pictured) among others.

On February 19, 2006, Yankovic began working on the album's parodies. During these sessions, three parodies were recorded; the first of these, "Canadian Idiot", is a play on "American Idiot" by Green Day. It is a satirical commentary on American nationalism and the stereotypical American view of Canadians. The song is ironic, and Yankovic has stated that the song's anger is a joke and that he loves Canada. Next, Yankovic began working on "Trapped in the Drive-Thru", a parody of R. Kelly's Trapped in the Closet. Yankovic was inspired to pen the spoof after hearing the "brilliant and wonderful and ridiculous" original. Efforts to make the parody more convoluted than the original were first considered but then abandoned by Yankovic; he eventually reasoned, however, that he could make his version "a little more stupid". Thus, the song is an excruciatingly detailed narrative about a couple going to a drive-thru, which was "the most banal thing [Yankovic] could think of at the time." Because the song was three times the length of a normal song, legally, Yankovic would have been required to pay thrice the statutory rate for royalties. This in turn would have forced Yankovic to remove one of his parodies from the album. However, R. Kelly allowed Yankovic to only pay the royalty rate for one song. To round out the first session, Yankovic recorded "Confessions Part III", a play on "Confessions Part II" by Usher. The song purports to be a continuation of the Usher songs "Confessions" and "Confessions Part II", focusing on trivial, silly, strange, and disturbing confessions; Yankovic explained that, "After hearing Usher do [the original songs], I couldn't help but think that maybe he'd left a few things out, that there were a few confessions he had yet to make."

After being denied permission to include "You're Pitiful" on the album, Yankovic wrote "Do I Creep You Out" and "White & Nerdy" to take its place, recording both on July 22, 2006. In the first of these, a singer addresses the object of his affection and stalking to the tune of "Do I Make You Proud" by Taylor Hicks; "Do I Creep You Out" was also Yankovic's jab at American Idol, a musical competition show that Hicks had won in May 2006. The final parody written and recorded for the album was "White & Nerdy", a parody of "Ridin' " by Chamillionaire featuring Krayzie Bone. The song describes the life of a white nerd whose wish to "roll with the gangstas" is impeded by his stereotypically white and nerdy behavior; the song is also filled with references to nerd culture. Yankovic later joked that it was a song he "was born to write" due to his association with nerd humor. While Yankovic usually records his songs together with his band, the backing tracks for "White & Nerdy" were completely recorded by guitarist Jim West—who handled the synthesizer production—and Jon "Bermuda" Schwartz—who was tasked with recording the drums. The two musicians recorded their specific tracks at their home studios, and the finished audio tracks were then brought to Westlake Studio in Los Angeles, California, where Yankovic added his vocals. Chamillionaire himself put "White & Nerdy" on his official MySpace page and said that he enjoys the parody. In an interview, he also stated he was pleasantly surprised by Yankovic's rapping ability, saying: "He's actually rapping pretty good on it, it's crazy ... I didn't know he could rap like that."

"Polkarama!", a medley of popular hit songs set to a polka beat, was recorded during the second parody session. Yankovic explained that, "if there's a song that I think is really ripe for parody but I just can't think of a clever enough idea, sometimes it'll end up in the polka medley." Regarding their popularity, Yankovic has said, "At this point, it's sort of mandatory for me to do a polka medley. Fans would be rioting in the streets, I think, if I didn't do a polka medley."

=== "You're Pitiful" controversy ===
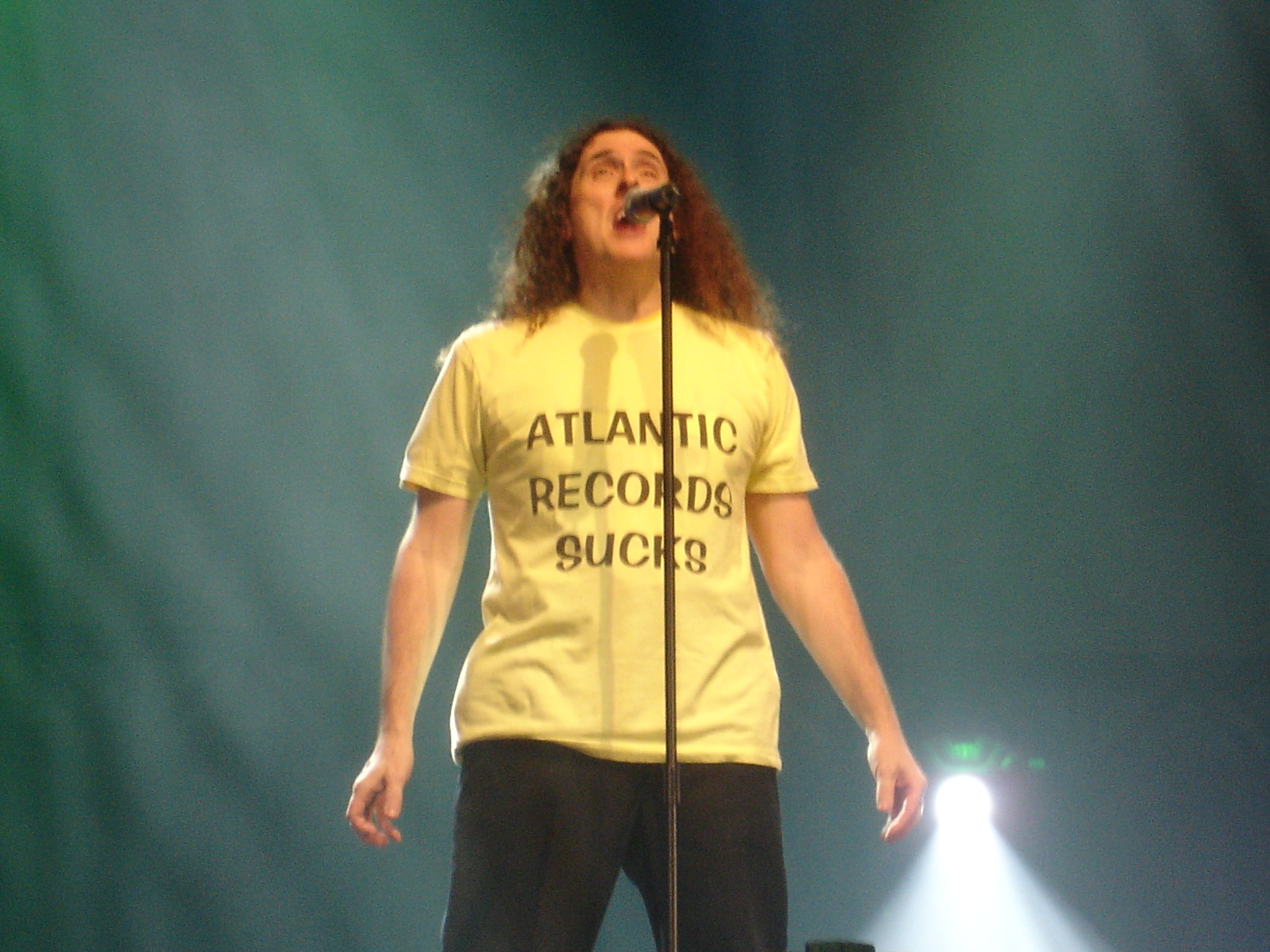
Weird Al wearing his "Atlantic Records Sucks" shirt during a performance of "You're Pitiful", on August 8, 2007, at the Ohio State Fair.

Yankovic had originally wanted to record a parody of James Blunt's hit "You're Beautiful" and release it as the lead single for the album. The parodist had approached Blunt about the spoof, and the singer approved his idea. Yankovic then went into the recording studio on April 12, 2006, and recorded his version, entitled "You're Pitiful". However, Blunt's record company, Atlantic Records, told Yankovic that he could not include the song on his album. Yankovic eventually learned that Atlantic felt "it was 'too early' in James' career for a parody, and that they were afraid that focusing any more attention on 'Beautiful' at that point might lead to the perception of James as a 'one-hit wonder.'"

The record company initially stated that they would permit Yankovic to release the parody at a later time. Later, Yankovic discovered that they had different intentions. Since Blunt himself was fine with the parody, Yankovic decided to release "You're Pitiful" as a free digital download on his website, noting that, "if James Blunt himself were objecting I wouldn't even offer my parody for free on my Web site. But since it's a bunch of suits—who are actually going against their own artist's wishes—I have absolutely no problem with it."

=== Unused ideas ===
Yankovic had wanted to record a parody of Daniel Powter's "Bad Day" for the album entitled "You Had a Bad Date", but Powter initially refused. Powter then changed his mind "literally the day before [Yankovic] went into the studio to record 'White & Nerdy'", at which point, according to Yankovic, "the train had left the station". T-Pain had also given Yankovic permission to record a parody of "I'm N Luv (Wit A Stripper)" called "I'm in Luv Wit Da Skipper", referencing the character from the 1960s sitcom Gilligan's Island. Yankovic later decided not to record the song, but T-Pain was still thanked in the album's liner notes, and Yankovic still performed the song in the parody medley during his Straight Outta Lynwood Tour. Besides his "Bad Day" and "I'm N Luv (Wit A Stripper)" parodies, Yankovic also claimed to have several "mediocre" ideas such as "Holodeck Girl" (a spoof of "Hollaback Girl" by Gwen Stefani), "IRS" (a play on "S.O.S." by Rihanna), and "HairyBack" (a parody of "SexyBack" by Justin Timberlake). In addition, Nickelback had originally given Yankovic permission to use their song "Photograph" in "Polkarama"; however, Yankovic was unable "to find a way to incorporate the song into ["Polkarama"] where it didn't sound wedged in or tacked on", and he decided not to use it. Yankovic nonetheless thanked Nickelback in the liner notes to Straight Outta Lynwood.

== Title and artwork ==
The title is a takeoff on the N.W.A album Straight Outta Compton. Lynwood, California, Yankovic's home town, is a neighboring community to Compton. The cover art, inspired by "gangsta imagery", depicts Yankovic, wearing a Lynwood letterman jacket and holding a pit bull on a leash, in front of a 1967 Chevrolet Impala convertible lowrider. All of the images from the album were photographed by Michael Blackwell on April 22, 2006. Blackwell is an Atlanta-based photographer who has also taken images of notable hip hop stars as T.I., Lil' Scrappy, and Young Jeezy. The cover features a pit bull named Dough Boy, owned by a local couple that were walking by during the photo shoot. Yankovic had always planned for this album to be titled Straight Outta Lynwood, even when the lead single was going to be "You're Pitiful"; Yankovic had liked the ironic juxtaposition of having a gangsta rap-inspired album cover and title, with "such a toothless ballad for the lead parody". However, the cover ended up being unintentionally appropriate when "White & Nerdy" became the lead track on the album. The numbers and letters on the album cover each have double meanings: "NLY" are the initials of both Yankovic's daughter and his father. The number "27" is an in-joke with Yankovic's fans, but February 7 was also his mother's birthday. The license plate originally read "27 4LIFE" during the photo shoot. The photo featured on the back of the CD case was Yankovic's initial pick to be the album's cover, before the current image was selected.

== Visuals ==
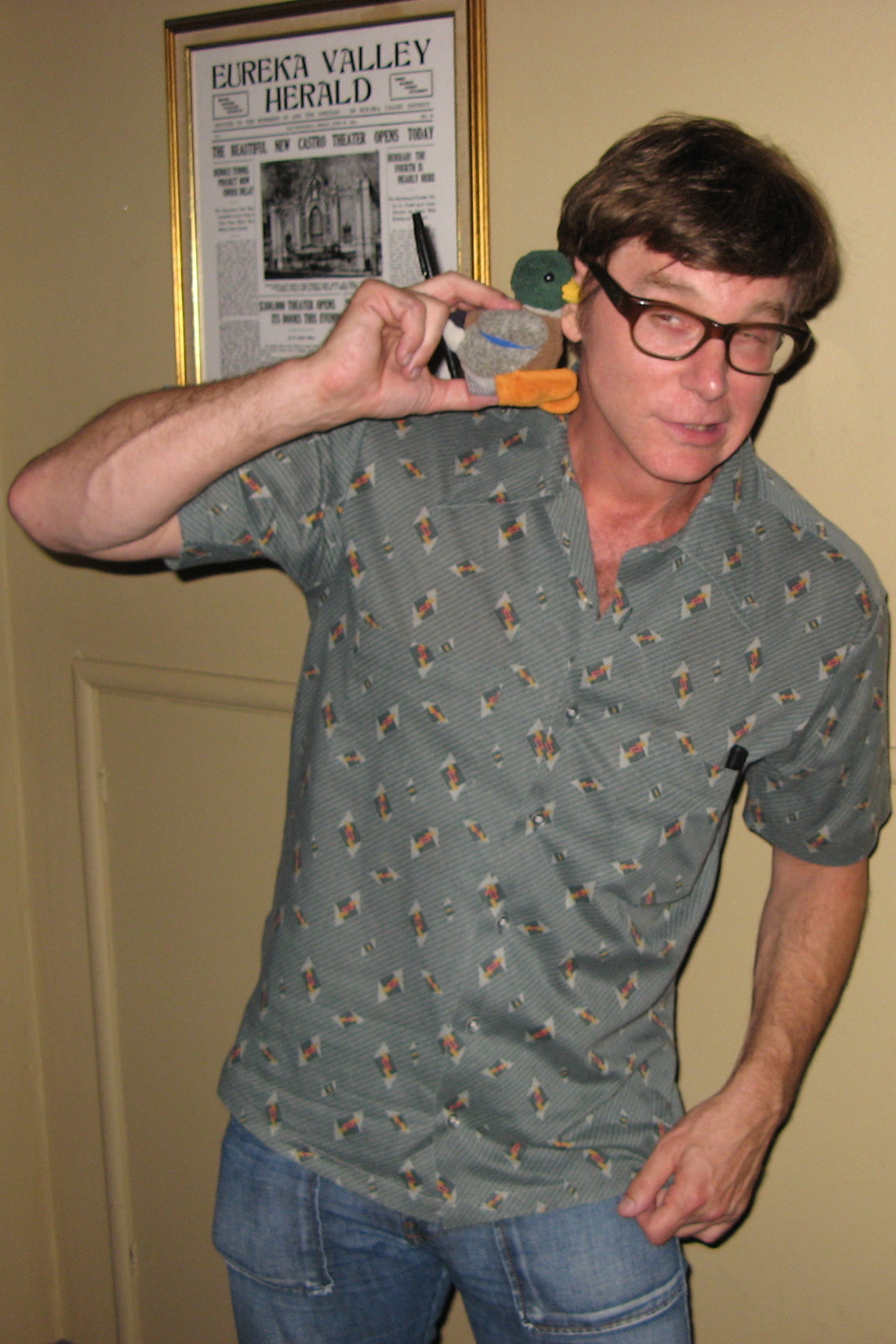
To create videos for many of the songs on the album, Yankovic worked with multiple animators, including John Kricfalusi.

While Yankovic's previous albums usually generated only one or two official music videos, Straight Outta Lynwood spawned nine, and the DualDisc release of the album included videos for all six original songs. Yankovic's record label had suggested he release a DualDisc, and he was in favor of the idea once he realized that he could hire animators to create videos for the original songs to make the release more rewarding for fans who purchased it. At first, Yankovic was unsure whom he would be able to hire, because of the budget, but to his surprise, many notable artists signed on. Bill Plympton created a hand-drawn video for "Don't Download This Song", which preceded the release of the album, and Thomas Lee, best known for his Flash music video "Star Wars Gangsta Rap", animated a video for "I'll Sue Ya". A music video for "Virus Alert" was helmed by David Lovelace (creator of the online animated series "Retarded Animal Babies"); Yankovic admitted to exercising more creative control over this video than the others present on the DVD, citing concern with Lovelace's previous content. John Kricfalusi and Katie Rice animated a video for "Close but No Cigar". Yankovic had long been a fan of Kricfalusi, who is perhaps best known as the creator of the cartoon series Ren & Stimpy. The video "takes an irreverent look at the world of dating as seen thru [sic] the eyes of Cigarettes the cat" (Cigarettes was a character previously featured in Kricfalusi's earlier projects The Goddamn George Liquor Program and Weekend Pussy Hunt). Jim Blashfield created a video for "Pancreas" using stock footage from the Prelinger Archives. Finally, Shadowmachine Films released a stop-motion video for "Weasel Stomping Day" that aired on September 24, 2006 as part of "The Munnery", the show's 32nd episode of the Adult Swim TV show Robot Chicken.

Subsequent videos were also made for three of the album's parodies. On August 15, 2006, Yankovic announced that he planned to shoot a music video for "White & Nerdy" in the Los Angeles area on August 21, 24, 25, and 27. He posted a solicitation for volunteers to appear in the video on his MySpace blog. The video was filmed in high definition. Originally, it was going to be released on September 18 at 9 PM Pacific Time on AOL.com, but, since the video had been leaked, AOL cancelled the premiere event and uploaded the video early. Soon thereafter, VH1 began airing the video in "large rotation", meaning it was shown roughly 20 times a day. Near the end of 2006, animators at JibJab made a video for "Do I Creep You Out", and Doug Bresler released a video for "Trapped in the Drive Thru" in 2007. In regards to the latter, Bresler's original cut of the video modelled the male in the song after Yankovic. Yankovic later asked that Bresler give the character a more neutral look, noting that if a live action video had been made, he "would almost certainly be playing a character [in the video, and] not 'Weird Al'". Bresler complied, and gave the character a more generic hairstyle. MuchMusic, a 24-hour Canadian cable music and variety television channel, ran a fan-made "Canadian Idiot" video contest on their website, but it was later scrapped due to lack of entries.

== Promotion ==
Following the release of Straight Outta Lynwood, Yankovic undertook the two-year-long Straight Outta Lynwood Tour. Starting on March 10, 2007 and concluding on August 28, 2008, Yankovic played 163 shows across the United States. To promote the album, a promotional website was launched for the single "Don't Download This Song", "dontdownloadthissong.com". The site allowed a user to launch an e-card that included a download and stream of the song, as well as options to email the card to friends.

== Critical reception ==
Professional ratings
Review scores
Source	Rating
AllMusic	3.5/5 stars
Stylus	B−
IGN	8/10
Pitchfork	7.3/10
Rolling Stone	3/5 stars
Slant Magazine	3/5 stars

Chris Carle of IGN awarded the album an 8 out of 10, denoting a "great" release. He called it "another solid record to add to the collection; just the right nostalgic blend of parodies, gross-out songs and polka." Specifically, he selected "White & Nerdy", "Polkarama!", and "Weasel Stomping Day" as the album's stand-out tracks, but felt that original songs like "Pancreas" and "I'll Sue Ya" were either not funny or "late to the party". David Jeffries of AllMusic awarded the record three-and-a-half stars out of five and called it "inspired". He highlighted "White & Nerdy" as a choice single, calling it a "reason to celebrate Yankovic's return". Jeffries applauded "Canadian Idiot" and "Trapped in the Drive-Thru", calling both funny, and he also noted that the originals from the album were humorous as well. However, he felt that the Usher and Taylor Hicks parodies were "only mildly humorous" and that some of the original songs "really drag" when compared to the others. Gavin Edwards of Rolling Stone awarded the album three out of five stars and highlighted "Trapped in the Drive-Thru" as the album's best song, writing, "'Weird Al' is funniest when he's singing about food."

Al Shipley of Stylus gave the album a "B−" and felt that, while "White & Nerdy" was a solid parody, the other spoofs on the album were not quite up to par. He praised "Pancreas" and "Virus Alert" as the album's best style parodies, comparing the latter to the 1985 single "Dare to Be Stupid", while criticizing "I'll Sue Ya", "Close but No Cigar", and "Don't Download This Song". Shipley concluded that the most hilarious moment on the album was Yankovic singing the lyrics to "Candy Shop" by 50 Cent over a polka beat in "Polkarama!" Scott Shetler of Slant Magazine awarded the album three stars out of five. He felt that in the 2000s, Yankovic's work had gradually declined in quality, but that Straight Outta Lynwood displayed "occasional flashes of genius", such as "White & Nerdy", which he praised for Yankovic's rapping ability. Shetler also felt that "Trapped in the Drive-Thru", was impressive, although he noted it was not as spectacular as it could have been. Once again, "Confessions, Pt. III" and "Do I Creep You Out" were described as "throwaways". However, Shetler wrote that "for once, Yankovic's originals are better than his parodies", highlighting "Pancreas", "I'll Sue Ya", and "Don't Download This Song" as the best songs on the album.

=== Accolades ===
Straight Outta Lynwood was nominated for two Grammy Awards in the categories for Best Comedy Album and Best Surround Sound Album. Rolling Stone later named "Trapped in the Drive Thru" as one of the 100 Greatest Songs of 2006, ranking it at 77th, while Blender ranked "White & Nerdy" at number 76 on their Top 100 Songs of 2006.

== Commercial performance ==
Straight Outta Lynwood was released on September 26, 2006. On April 4, 2007, the album was certified gold for shipments exceeding 500,000 copies. The album's lead-off single, "White & Nerdy", was a hit on the Billboard Hot 100, charting at number 9. This made it his highest-charting single, surpassing "Eat It", which had peaked at number 12 in 1984. It also marked the first time that Yankovic had ever cracked the top ten of the Billboard Hot 100. "Canadian Idiot" also charted on the Hot 100, peaking at number 82. On June 15, 2007, "White & Nerdy" was certified gold—his first gold single since "Eat It" in 1984—and on January 31, 2008, the single was certified platinum for selling over 1,000,000 copies, making this the first time that Yankovic had ever achieved this level of certification. In addition, the ringtone for "White & Nerdy" was certified gold.

Internationally, the album charted at number 27 on the Australian Albums Chart. "White & Nerdy" also peaked at number 14 on the Swedish singles chart, and number 80 on the UK Singles Chart.

In late 2013, Yankovic sued his label, Volcano, and its parent company Sony Music Entertainment, for unpaid publishing royalties from several of his albums, as well as for his track "White & Nerdy". Yankovic claimed that—despite the song's viral success—he never earned royalties from the single. The initial lawsuit was for $5 million; Yankovic won the lawsuit and was awarded an undisclosed sum of money from Sony.

== Track listing ==
No.	Title	Writer(s)	Parody of	Length
1.	"White & Nerdy"	Hakeem Seriki, Juan Salinas, Oscar Salinas, Anthony Henderson, Alfred Yankovic	"Ridin'" by Chamillionaire featuring Krayzie Bone	2:50
2.	"Pancreas"	Yankovic	Style parody of Brian Wilson	3:48
3.	"Canadian Idiot"	Billie Joe Armstrong, Yankovic	"American Idiot" by Green Day	2:23
4.	"I'll Sue Ya"	Yankovic	Style parody of Rage Against the Machine	3:51
5.	"Polkarama!"	Various; arranged by Yankovic	A polka medley including: "Chicken Dance" by Werner Thomas; "Let's Get It Started" by The Black Eyed Peas; "Take Me Out" by Franz Ferdinand; "Beverly Hills" by Weezer; "Speed of Sound" by Coldplay; "Float On" by Modest Mouse; "Feel Good Inc." by Gorillaz featuring De La Soul; "Don't Cha" by Pussycat Dolls featuring Busta Rhymes; "Somebody Told Me" by The Killers; "Slither" by Velvet Revolver; "Candy Shop" by 50 Cent featuring Olivia; "Drop It Like It's Hot" by Snoop Dogg featuring Pharrell; "Pon de Replay" by Rihanna; "Gold Digger" by Kanye West featuring Jamie Foxx; "The Nina Bobina Polka" by "Weird Al" Yankovic	4:17
6.	"Virus Alert"	Yankovic	Style parody of Sparks	3:46
7.	"Confessions Part III"	Usher Raymond IV, Jermaine Mauldin, Bryan-Michael Cox, Yankovic	"Confessions Part II" by Usher	3:52
8.	"Weasel Stomping Day"	Yankovic	Style parody of animated musical specials of the 1960s	1:34
9.	"Close but No Cigar"	Yankovic	Style parody of Cake	3:55
10.	"Do I Creep You Out"	Tracy Ackerman, Andy Watkins, Paul Wilson, Yankovic	"Do I Make You Proud" by Taylor Hicks	2:46
11.	"Trapped in the Drive-Thru"	Robert Kelly, James Page, Robert Plant, John Baldwin, Yankovic	"Trapped in the Closet" by R. Kelly; contains an interpolation of "Black Dog" by Led Zeppelin	10:50
12.	"Don't Download This Song"	Yankovic	Style parody of 1980s charity songs	3:54
Total length:				47:45

== Personnel ==
Credits adapted from CD liner notes, except where noted.

Band members

- "Weird Al" Yankovic – lead vocals (tracks 1–12), background vocals (tracks 1–11), piano (track 2), harpsichord (track 2), vibraphone (track 2), tannerin (track 2), accordion (tracks 2, 5), harmonica (track 2), bass harmonica (track 2), toy piano (track 2), finger snaps (tracks 2, 5), hand claps (tracks 2, 5, 9, 12), keyboards (tracks 4, 6, 11), bulb horn (track 5), ratchet (track 5), group vocals (track 5), vibraslap (track 9), choir vocals (track 12)
- Jim West – keyboard programming (track 1), acoustic guitar (track 2), banjo (tracks 2, 5), ukulele (track 2), finger snaps (tracks 2, 5), hand claps (tracks 2, 5, 9, 12), electric guitar (tracks 3–4, 6–7, 9–12), group vocals (track 5), chorus vocals (track 9), choir vocals (track 12)
- Jon "Bermuda" Schwartz – drum programming (tracks 1, 7, 11), drums (tracks 2–6, 8–10, 12), sleigh bells (track 2), tympani (tracks 2, 8), tambourine (tracks 2, 5–6, 9–10, 12), wood blocks (tracks 2, 5, 8), shaker (track 2), jaw harp (tracks 2, 5), siren whistle (tracks 2, 5), slide whistle (track 2, 5), claves (track 2), cabasa (track 2), bicycle bell (track 2), finger snaps (track 2, 5), hand claps (track 2, 5, 9, 12), flexitone (track 5), bird call (track 5), duck call (track 5), group vocals (track 5), whistle (track 6), maracas (track 9), cowbell (track 9), hi-hat sequencing (track 9), chorus vocals (track 9), Simmons drums (track 12), bar chimes (track 12)
- Steve Jay – bass guitar (tracks 2–6, 9–10, 12), banjo (track 2), flute (track 2), finger snaps (track 2, 5), hand claps (track 2, 5, 9, 12), bass vocals (tracks 5, 8), group vocals (track 5), synth bass (tracks 7, 11), choir vocals (track 12)

Additional musicians

- Miles Jay – string bass (tracks 2, 8)
- Sarah O'Brien – cello (track 2)
- John Dickson – French horn (tracks 2, 12)
- Lee Thornburg – trumpet (tracks 2, 6, 9, 12)
- Nick Lane – trombone (tracks 2, 6, 8, 12)
- Warren Luening – trumpet (track 5)
- Joel Peskin – clarinet (track 5)
- Tommy Johnson – tuba (track 5)
- Kim Bullard – keyboards (tracks 7, 11–12)
- Lisa Popeil – female vocals (track 8), background vocals (track 10), choir vocals (track 12)
- Angie Jaree – female vocals (track 8), choir vocals (track 12)
- Kim Erin – female vocals (track 8), choir vocals (track 12)
- Monique Donnelly – female vocals (track 8), background vocals (track 10), choir vocals (track 12)
- Suzanne Yankovic – weasel noises (track 8)
- Nina Yankovic – weasel noises (track 8)
- Bo Yankovic – weasel noises (track 8)
- Rubén Valtierra – keyboards (track 10)
- Scottie Haskell – background vocals (track 10)
- David Joyce – choir vocals (track 12)
- Randy Crenshaw – choir vocals (track 12)

Technical

- Al Yankovic – producer
- Jim West – orchestral arrangement (track 8)
- Tony Papa – engineer, mixing
- Rafael Serrano – engineer
- Jason Rankins – assistant engineer
- Brian Warwick – assistant engineer
- John Adams – assistant engineer
- Phillip Ramos – assistant engineer
- Bernie Grundman – mastering
- Jeff Gilligan – art direction, design
- Michael Blackwell – photography
- Crystle Streets – styling
- Cazzie Mayorga – hair stylist
- Walter Barnett – set designer
- Emily Harrell – producer (for STIR)

== Charts and certifications ==
=== Charts ===
Chart performance for Straight Outta Lynwood
Chart (2006)	Peak position
Australian Albums Chart	27
US Billboard 200	10
US Comedy Albums	1
US Top Internet Albums	10

=== Certifications ===
Country	Certification (sales thresholds)
United States	Gold

=== Singles ===
Year	Song	Peak positions		
Year	Song	US	SWE	UK
2006	"White & Nerdy"	9	14	80
2006	"Canadian Idiot"	82	—	—
