= White & Nerdy =

2006 single by "Weird Al" Yankovic

Single by "Weird Al" Yankovic

from the album Straight Outta Lynwood
- B-side: "Don't Download This Song"
- Released: 2006
- Recorded: July 22, 2006
- Studio: Westlake Recording
- Genre: Comedy hip hop; parody; nerdcore
- Length: 2:50
- Label: Volcano
- Songwriters: "Weird Al" Yankovic; H. Seriki; A. Henderson
- Producer: "Weird Al" Yankovic

"Weird Al" Yankovic singles chronology
| "Don't Download This Song" (2006) | "White & Nerdy" (2006) | "Canadian Idiot" (2006) |

Music video
- "White & Nerdy" on YouTube

"White & Nerdy" is the second single from "Weird Al" Yankovic's album Straight Outta Lynwood, which was released in 2006. It parodies the song "Ridin'" by Chamillionaire and Krayzie Bone. The song both satirizes and celebrates nerd culture, as recited by the subject, who cannot "roll with the gangstas" because he is "just too white and nerdy". It includes many references to activities stereotypically associated with nerds and/or white people, such as collecting comic books and action figures, being fluent in JavaScript and Klingon, editing Wikipedia, and playing Dungeons & Dragons. Yankovic also mentions wanting to go bowling with gangsters.

The song was Yankovic's only US Billboard Hot 100 top 10 song, peaking at No. 9, and his second to reach the top 20 in America after "Eat It" peaked at No. 12 in 1984. "White & Nerdy" was certified platinum by the Recording Industry Association of America (RIAA), becoming Yankovic's first single to achieve this feat.

== Production and writing ==
Although "Weird Al" Yankovic usually records his songs with his band, the backing tracks for "White and Nerdy" were recorded by guitarist Jim West—who handled the synthesizer production—and Jon "Bermuda" Schwartz—who recorded the drums. The backing musicians recorded their respective tracks at their home studios. Yankovic added his rap vocals later at Westlake Studio in Los Angeles, California.

== Music video ==
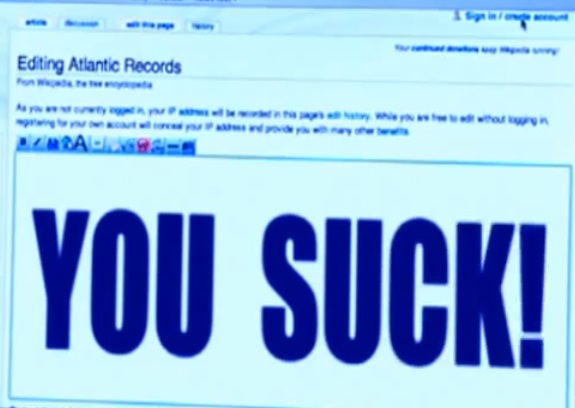
Al depicted expressing his opinion about Atlantic Records on Wikipedia

The single has an accompanying music video, which was recorded in digital high definition, unusual for the time, although there was no practical way to share the format en masse at the time. The video, loosely parodying the video for Chamillionaire's "Ridin'" and following the song's lyrics, shows Yankovic, dressed as a stereotypical nerd with a buttoned-up polo shirt, dress slacks, and horn-rimmed glasses attempting to fit in with the "gangsters" (the first ones being Keegan-Michael Key and Jordan Peele), in a blue 1967 Chevy Impala convertible (Yankovic is later depicted as owning a Toyota Prius) but instead either scaring them away, causing them to flip him the bird, or to direct him away from their group and instead towards a herd of other "nerds". These scenes include shots that directly parody the "Ridin'" video, including similar outfits by both artists. Yankovic is seen at night dancing in front of a set of road flares arranged in the form of Pac-Man, similar to the shot of Chamillionaire in front of the figure of a lizard, his personal logo. Another repeated scene shows Yankovic along with Donny Osmond—the "whitest guy I could think of", according to Yankovic—dancing in front of the Schrödinger equation, mimicking shots of Chamillionaire and Krayzie Bone from the "Ridin'" video. Yankovic had found Osmond to be eager to be in the video, having memorized the song before recording as well as having his various moves already figured out before filming.

Further interspersed among these shots are additional shots of Yankovic demonstrating his "white and nerdy" life. One scene shows Yankovic vandalizing the Wikipedia page for Atlantic Records, replacing it with the words (in a large font size) "YOU SUCK!", referencing his then-recent troubles with the company in getting permission to release "You're Pitiful", a parody of James Blunt's song "You're Beautiful". Fans of the video have replicated the action depicted in the video several times. The video shows a fictional Trivial Pursuit card, with questions that include the location of the largest ball of twine (a reference to his song "The Biggest Ball of Twine in Minnesota"), on what page Harry Potter would die in the next book, and the number of Wicket men there are on a 43-Man Squamish team (there are five).

The video includes other cameos. The Impala's "OG4LIFE" license plate refers to Ice-T's 1991 album Original Gangster. Seth Green, whom Yankovic had known for some time, appears in front of a wall display of action figures. Green also provided a number of the props for the video. Judy Tenuta, a regular on The Weird Al Show who also previously appeared in "Headline News", plays the woman who receives a surge protector as a present. Other actors were recruited by Yankovic through his MySpace page, from which he received extras who said they would appear for free. The video's comic book store is Golden Apple Comics in Los Angeles, California.

The video was leaked onto YouTube on September 17, 2006, one day before the planned official release date on AOL. Due to the leak, the premiere was canceled, and AOL silently slipped the video onto their website. VH1 started airing the video in "large rotation" on September 20, 2006; the video debuted at #5 on their Top 20 countdown.

=== Fan-made video ===
Yahoo! Music solicited online members to make a fans-only video for "White & Nerdy". The video was released in late 2006.

== Live performances ==
On November 2, 2006, Yankovic performed "White & Nerdy" live on The Tonight Show with Jay Leno. (He rode a Segway as he came on stage.) It was his first public live performance of the song; various background vocals from the original recording are played to allow him time to breathe during the fast-paced lyrics. Since then, however, his band has provided live background vocals. On December 3, he performed the song live at the VH1 "Big In '06" Awards. Since 2007, Yankovic has performed the song on each one of his tours, entering the stage on a Segway and wearing his hoodie and bandana from the video rather than using his "nerd" look. His band members maintain the "nerdy" outfits.

== Awards and accolades ==
The song became Yankovic's first career Top 10 hit on the Billboard Hot 100, a record 23 years after his first appearance on the Hot 100 chart with "Ricky" in 1983. It debuted at #28 on the Hot 100 (that week's "Hot Shot Debut"), and peaked at #9 the following week, beating his previous #12 peak for 1984's "Eat It". It spent a total of 20 weeks on the Hot 100, including 5 weeks in the Top 20 and 10 weeks in the Top 40. This was also his first Top 40 single since 1992's "Smells Like Nirvana". It peaked on the Hot Digital Songs chart at #5. Both the song and the music video reached #1 at the U.S. and Australian iTunes Store, and peaked at #1 on VH1's top 20 video countdown. Both "White & Nerdy" and Straight Outta Lynwood were certified gold, and later platinum, by the RIAA. This marks the first time any one of Yankovic's singles has been certified platinum.

== Reaction from Chamillionaire ==
Chamillionaire placed "White & Nerdy" on his MySpace page, commenting that he enjoyed the parody. In an interview, Chamillionaire complimented Yankovic's rapping ability, saying, "He's actually rapping pretty good on it, it's crazy ... I didn't know he could rap like that." Yankovic stated that Chamillionaire approached and thanked him on the red carpet after "Ridin'" won the Grammy award for Best Rap Song at the 49th Annual Grammy Awards and said that the parody "made it undeniable that ["Ridin'"] was the rap song of the year".

== Track listing ==
1. "White & Nerdy" – 2:50
2. "Don't Download This Song" – 3:54

== Personnel ==
- "Weird Al" Yankovic – lead and backing vocals
- Jim West – keyboard programming
- Jon "Bermuda" Schwartz – drum programming

== Chart positions ==
=== Weekly ===
Weekly chart performance for "White & Nerdy"
| Chart (2006–2007) | Peak position |
|---|---|
| Australian Digital Track Chart (ARIA) | 12 |
| Canadian Digital Songs | 9 |
| Swedish Singles Chart | 14 |
| UK Singles Chart | 80 |
| US Billboard Hot 100 | 9 |

=== Year-end ===
Year-end chart performance for "White & Nerdy"
| Chart (2006) | Position |
|---|---|
| Swedish Singles Chart | 90 |

== Certifications ==
Certifications for "White & Nerdy"
| Region | Certification | Certified units/sales |
|---|---|---|
| United States (RIAA) Digital | Platinum | 1,000,000^{*} |
| United States (RIAA) Mastertone | Gold | 500,000^{*} |
^{*} Sales figures based on certification alone.

== See also ==
- List of singles by "Weird Al" Yankovic
- List of songs by "Weird Al" Yankovic
- "It's All About the Pentiums" – a song with a similar topic, also by Yankovic
- Wikipedia in popular culture
