= Jim West (guitarist) =

Canadian guitarist (b. 1953)

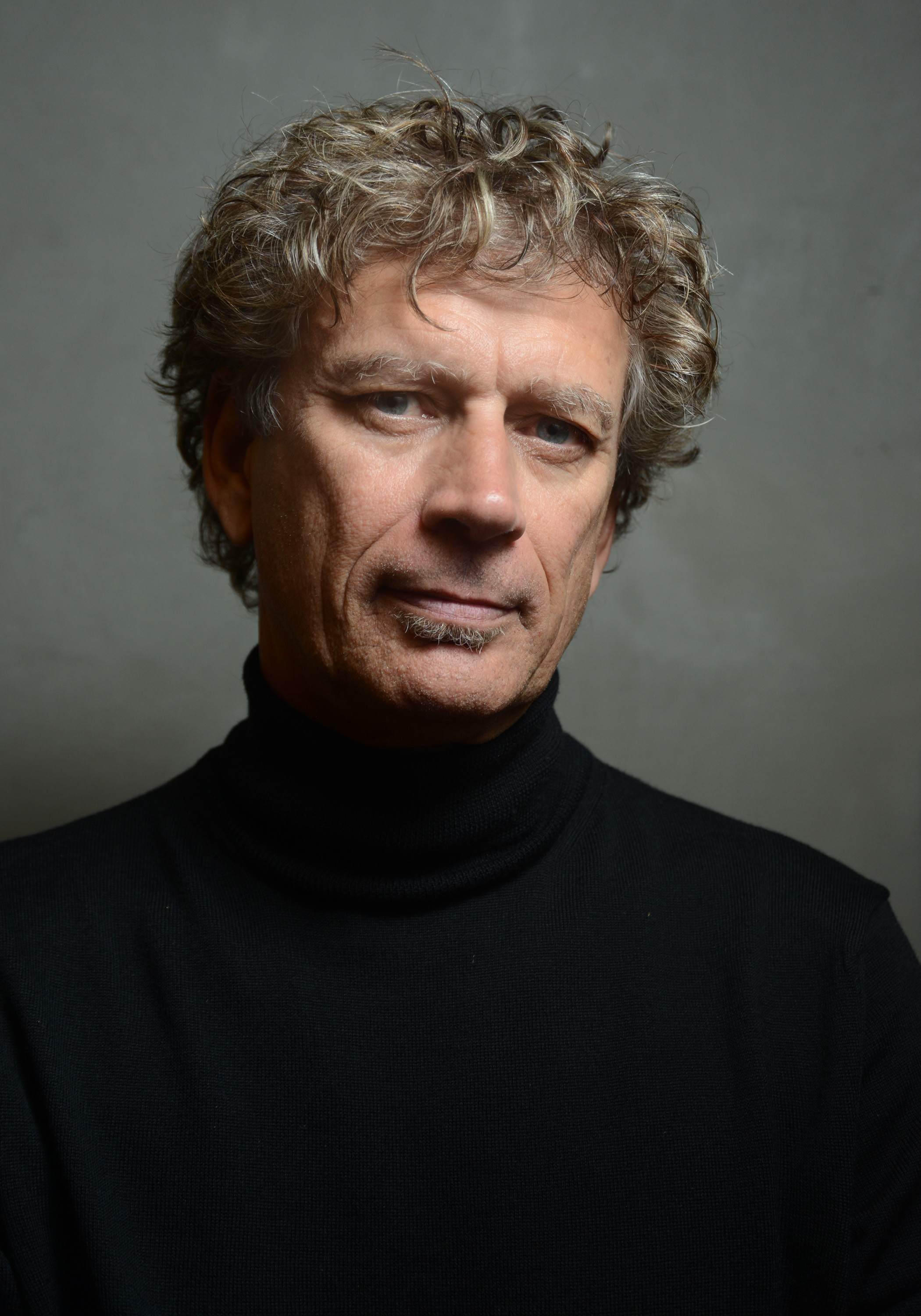

Background information
- Born: James West; December 18, 1953 (age 72); Toronto, Ontario, Canada
- Genres: Rock; slack-key guitar
- Occupations: Musician; composer; producer
- Instrument: Guitar
- Years active: 1979–present
- Labels: Westernmost; Scotti Brothers; Volcano; Placebo
- Website: jimkimowest.com

James West (born December 18, 1953), also known as Kimo, is an American-Canadian guitarist best known for working with comedic musician "Weird Al" Yankovic.

== Biography ==
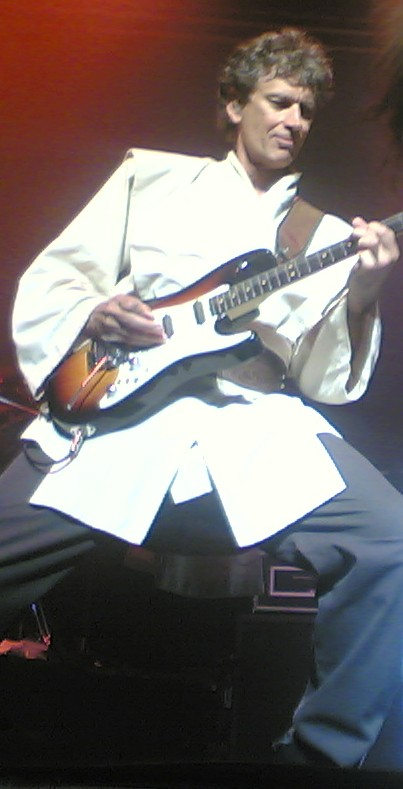
West performing guitar for "Yoda" in a Jedi costume on March 10, 2007

West was born in Toronto, Ontario on December 18, 1953, and grew up in Tampa, Florida. At age 12, he started playing guitar. By age 16, he was playing professionally in various Florida rock bands, including at least one with later bandmate Steve Jay.

In the early 1980s, he came to Los Angeles, where Jay introduced him to "Weird Al" Yankovic. He auditioned for Yankovic after being introduced by Steve Jay and the two have worked together ever since. West can be heard and seen on all of Yankovic's videos, albums, and concerts since 1983.

West is also a composer for film and television and produced a number of CDs for independent artists. He has released fourteen solo slack-key guitar albums. He performs regularly at concerts and festivals.

In 2018, he received his first Grammy nomination a Moku Maluhia: Peaceful Island in the category of Best New Age Album. In 2020 his album, More Guitar Stories received another Grammy nomination for Best New Age Album and subsequently won that category.

He has a private studio in Los Angeles, but spends several months a year in Hana, Hawaii. He retains his Canadian citizenship.

== Discography ==
=== With "Weird Al" Yankovic ===
- In 3-D
- Dare to Be Stupid
- Polka Party!
- Even Worse
- UHF - Original Motion Picture Soundtrack and Other Stuff
- Off the Deep End
- Alapalooza
- Bad Hair Day
- Running with Scissors
- Poodle Hat
- Straight Outta Lynwood
- Alpocalypse
- Mandatory Fun

=== Co-leader albums ===
- With Greg Leisz, Hotel Honolulu – The Hawaiian Tribute to the Eagles (CHM, 2007)
- With Ken Emerson, Slackers In Paradise (Westernmost, 2016)

=== Solo albums ===
- 1999 – Coconut Hat
- 2004 – Nurturing the Garden – commission for the National Tropical Botanical Garden on Kaua'i
- 2005 – Slack Key West
- 2006 – The Hawaiian Tribute To Sublime: Livin's EZ
- 2007 – Hawaiian Slack Key Guitar-Kimo Style
- 2008 – Kimo's Hawaiian Slack Key Christmas
- 2012 – Na Lani O Maui: Maui Skies
- 2013 – Ki Ho'alu Christmastime
- 2015 – Guitar Stories: Slack Key & Beyond
- 2018 – Moku Maluhia: Peaceful Island
- 2020 – More Guitar Stories
- 2021 – Ka Honua Maluhia: Peaceful World

=== Producer ===
- "Eia Mai Ka La" by Kapo Ku
- Lily Wilson by Lily Wilson
- Jose Can U See? by Bill Dana
- The Enchanted Forest
- Broken by Cynthia Clawson
- The Koolanesian Heart by Norm Compton
- Stepping Out by Diana Krall

=== Compilations ===
- The Rocky Story

== Awards and nominations ==
=== Grammy Awards ===
Year	Category	Nominated work	Result
2019	Best New Age Album	Moku Maluhia: Peaceful Island	Nominated
2021	Best New Age Album	More Guitar Stories	Won
