= Steve Jay =

American bassist (born 1951)

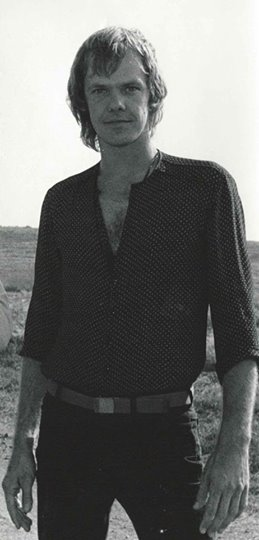

Background information
- Born: Eugene Stephen Jay; January 26, 1951 (age 75); Detroit, Michigan, U.S.
- Occupation: Musician
- Instruments: Bass guitar; banjo; guitar; keyboards; flute; recorder; vocals

Eugene Stephen Jay (born January 26, 1951) is an American bassist, best known for working with "Weird Al" Yankovic.

== Early life ==
Jay was born Eugene Stephen Jay in Detroit, Michigan on January 26, 1951. He auditioned for "Weird Al" Yankovic in 1981 after answering an ad in the newspaper, and the two have worked together ever since. Jay can be heard or seen on all of Yankovic's albums, videos, and concerts.

He is also the founder of the ethno-funk duo Ak & Zuie, with Pete Gallagher. He has scored more than fifty nationally broadcast PBS specials and series episodes, including three George Foster Peabody Award winners, and contributed to several feature films. He has also done extensive session work, released eight solo records on his own Ayarou label, and produced two albums for the WEA Nonesuch Explorer series.

Jay's background includes a BA and MM Graduate Fellowship in composition from the University of South Florida in 1972. After completing his studies, he went to Niger and spent two and half years studying drumming. Selections from his archival field recordings of traditional West African ceremonies, dances, and solo performances were made into three albums released by Warner/Nonesuch.

== Discography ==
=== Nonesuch Explorer Series ===
- Ghana: Ancient Ceremonies, Songs, and Dance Music
- Dances of the World
- West Africa: Drum, Chant, and Instrumental Music

=== With "Weird Al" Yankovic ===
- "Weird Al" Yankovic
- "Weird Al" Yankovic In 3-D
- Dare to Be Stupid
- Polka Party!
- Even Worse
- UHF - Original Motion Picture Soundtrack and Other Stuff
- Off the Deep End
- Alapalooza
- Bad Hair Day
- Running with Scissors
- Poodle Hat
- Straight Outta Lynwood
- Alpocalypse
- Mandatory Fun

=== Solo albums ===
- Sea Never Dry – 1997
- Film Music – 1998 – a collection of 66 short excerpts from his original film and television scores
- Tangled Strings – 1999
- Self Avoiding Random Walk – 2000
- Outer Voice – 2004
- Rounder Gaze – 2004
- Friction – 2004
- Plus – 2004
- Physical Answer – 2008
- Chaos, Clouds and Tongue – 2011
- Things Change – 2013
- El Natural 7 – 2016
- Spontaneous Symmetry – 2016
- When One Remains – 2016
- So Do I Sadie – 2018
- Vita Beata – 2022
- Off-Bass – 2025

=== With Ak & Zuie ===
- Non-Franciscan Duets

=== Compilations ===
- Deep Forest
- Late in the 20th Century: An Elektra / Nonesuch New Music Sampler
