= Volcano Entertainment =

Defunct American record label

Volcano Entertainment, III, L.L.C.
- Parent company: Zomba Recording Corporation (1998–2003); Q Prime (1998–2000); BMG (2003–2004); Sony BMG Music Entertainment (2004–2008); Sony Music Entertainment (2008–present)
- Founded: 1996; 30 years ago
- Founder: Kevin Czinger
- Status: Dormant
- Distributors: Sony Music (In the US); RCA Records (Outside the US); Legacy Recordings (Reissues)
- Genre: Various
- Country of origin: United States
- Location: Los Angeles, New York City

Volcano Entertainment (sometimes referred to as Volcano Records) is an American all-round music record label founded in 1996 which released albums by Tool, 311, Survivor and "Weird Al" Yankovic. (The latter two were former Scotti Bros. Records artists and the only artists retained from that label.) The Volcano Records catalog is owned by RCA Records, a division of Sony Music Entertainment.

== History ==
Volcano Records was founded in 1996 by Kevin Czinger. It is essentially the continuation of Zoo Entertainment which Czinger bought from BMG in 1996. Initially, the company was meant to have two divisions Zoo/Volcano and Volcano which would be a hip-hop imprint. The first album released with the new ownership was Tool's album Ænima followed by actor Keanu Reeves' band Dogstar's album Our Little Visionary. However, the Zoo name was eventually phased out in mid-1997 and many of Zoo artists became the cornerstone of the Volcano roster.

In October 1997, Volcano merged with Dallas Austin's Rowdy Records to become Freeworld Entertainment. Freeworld was short-lived, as the label was plagued with financial trouble and the relationship with Austin faltered. Many of the label's employees were either cut or left. Additionally, the label's flagship artist Tool was attempting to leave the label which resulted in a lengthy lawsuit.

In the spring of 1998, Freeworld was purchased and "saved" by the Zomba Label Group. Though the Zoo branding was briefly reintroduced, Zomba quickly returned the Volcano moniker, abandoning Zoo altogether. A month later, Q Prime, led by top managers Cliff Burnstein and Peter Mensch, purchased a 50% stake in Volcano and made sure that hard-rock artist Tool would stay. They would sell their share back to Zomba in the early 2000s.

1998 also marked the year that Volcano acquired the contracts and masters of Scotti Bros. Records which had just been purchased by Pearson PLC. Volcano also purchased Capricorn Records in December 2000.

In 2002, Zomba was purchased by BMG, returning Volcano to the BMG umbrella it had previously been a part of as Zoo Entertainment in the early nineties. Volcano now controls the Scotti Bros. Records, Capricorn Records (later) and Zoo Entertainment catalogs.

With Yankovic fulfilling his Sony contract on their main label RCA, with his 2014 album Mandatory Fun, Volcano functions primarily as a reissue label. Tool released its contract fulfillment album for Volcano, Fear Inoculum, on August 30, 2019, through Tool Dissectional/Volcano/RCA, completing their five-album requirement.

== Releases ==
Volcano products were initially distributed by BMG. When Zomba purchased the label in 1998, distribution was handled through the Zomba network which, depending on the territory, may have been BMG, Virgin, Zomba itself or other smaller labels. When Zomba was purchased by BMG, BMG became the sole worldwide distributor again. Between 2004 and late 2008 distribution switched to Sony BMG in accordance with the merger of Sony and BMG. Since early 2009, Sony Music Entertainment distributes Volcano products worldwide.

== See also ==
- List of record labels
- Zoo Entertainment
- Freeworld Entertainment
