= The Night Santa Went Crazy =

1996 single by "Weird Al" Yankovic

Single by "Weird Al" Yankovic

from the album Bad Hair Day
- B-side: "Christmas at Ground Zero"
- Released: November 26, 1996
- Recorded: December 1, 1994
- Genre: Comedy rock; Christmas
- Length: 4:03
- Label: Scotti Brothers
- Songwriter: "Weird Al" Yankovic
- Producer: "Weird Al" Yankovic

"Weird Al" Yankovic singles chronology
"Spy Hard" (1996)	"The Night Santa Went Crazy" (1996)	"The Saga Begins" (1999)

"The Night Santa Went Crazy" is an original song performed by "Weird Al" Yankovic. The black comedy Christmas song is performed as a pastiche of "Black Gold" by Soul Asylum. It has melodic references to "Black Gold", "Mama, I'm Coming Home" by Ozzy Osbourne, and "I Believe in Father Christmas" by Greg Lake.

It is the twelfth and final track on the album Bad Hair Day, released as a single during the 1996 Christmas season. The "extra gory" version of the song appears on the compilation album The Essential "Weird Al" Yankovic. Both albums have received positive critical reviews.

== Lyrics ==
The song starts with Santa's elves making Christmas presents for good, "Gentile" children. Suddenly, a drunken Santa bursts in with a rifle in his hand, and covered with ammunition "like a big, fat, drunk, disgruntled Yuletide Rambo". He says, "Merry Christmas to all, now you're all gonna die!" He proceeds to destroy half of the North Pole, hold the elves and helpers hostage, and kill most of his reindeer in various graphic, sadistic ways. The National Guard and FBI come to restore order.

The song's epilogue has two different versions, with one version being called the "Extra Gory Version". In the original epilogue, the singer explains to Virginia that Santa was arrested and locked up in a federal prison, with the possibility of release for good behavior in 700 years. Meanwhile, the two surviving reindeer, Vixen and Donner, are coping with post-traumatic stress disorder, and the elves get jobs working for the postal service. In the Extra Gory Version of the song, it is instead stated that Santa is killed by a SWAT officer, and with Christmas having effectively been ended altogether, the elves file for unemployment benefits. This version also references a quote from U.S. President Richard Nixon, saying "I guess they won't have the fat guy to kick around anymore". Both versions of the song also have Mrs. Claus negotiating film rights for the incident. The singer surmises that Santa Claus had grown tired of only receiving milk and cookies for his work, concluded he was getting "gypped", and went postal because of it.

== Release ==
"The Night Santa Went Crazy" was released as the third and final single from Bad Hair Day on November 26, 1996; the CD single features "The Night Santa Went Crazy" and "Christmas at Ground Zero", another holiday-themed song from Yankovic's 1986 album Polka Party!. The cover art displays the original drawing of Santa Claus by Mark Osborne that inspired Yankovic to write the song. Though the single did not chart upon original release, it later peaked at number 35 on the United States Billboard Holiday Digital Tracks chart in 2010.

An "extra gory" version of the song was included as the third track on the "Amish Paradise" single. In this version, Vixen and Donner are not mentioned (leaving their fate ambiguous), Santa is killed by a member of the SWAT team, and the elves file for unemployment benefits. Another rendition combining elements of the album and the "extra gory" versions was written for Yankovic's Touring with Scissors tour in 1999; it is featured on the "Weird Al" Yankovic Live! video album. He later performed "The Night Santa Went Crazy" on the television variety show Penn & Teller's Sin City Spectacular.

The "Extra Gory" version is on the compilation album The Essential "Weird Al" Yankovic, and on the album Medium Rarities.

== Track listing ==
- CD single
1. "The Night Santa Went Crazy" – 4:03
2. "Christmas at Ground Zero" – 3:07

== Personnel ==
These credits are adapted from Bad Hair Day liner notes.

- "Weird Al" Yankovic – arrangement, keyboards, vocals, production
- Bernie Grundman – mastering
- Steve Jay – bass, background vocals
- Tony Papa – engineering, mixing
- Colin Sauers – additional engineering
- Jon "Bermuda" Schwartz – percussion, drums
- Rubén Valtierra – keyboards
- Jim West – guitar, background vocals

== Charts ==
Chart (2010)	Peak position
US Holiday Digital Tracks (Billboard)	35

== See also ==
- "Father Christmas"
