= List of "Weird Al" Yankovic polka medleys =

Polka-style song covers by "Weird Al" Yankovic

Polka-style medleys of cover songs are a distinguishing part of American musician, satirist, parodist, and songwriter "Weird Al" Yankovic's catalog. Twelve of his fourteen albums contain them; his self-titled debut and Even Worse omit them.

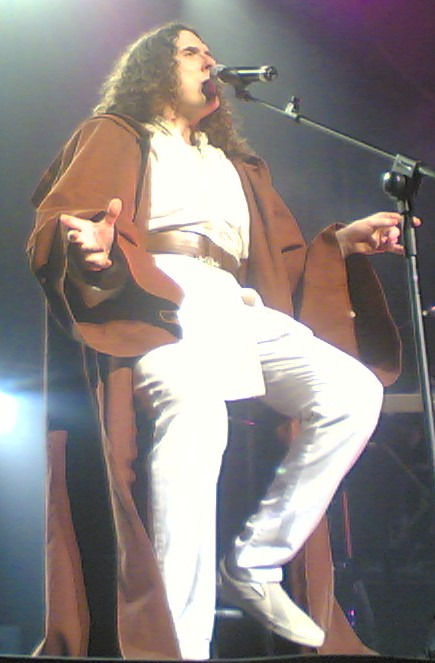
"Weird Al" Yankovic performing "The Saga Begins" in 2007

The medleys are composed of various popular songs, each one reinterpreted as a polka (generally an instrumentation of accordion, banjo, tuba, clarinet, and muted brass interspersed with sound effects) with the choruses or memorable lines of various songs juxtaposed for humorous effect and profane lyrics are covered with cartoon sound effects. Yankovic has been known to say that converting these songs to polka was "...the way God intended". Yankovic said that the medleys were something he did "even before I had a record deal" in live performances, and that many of the songs are included due to not receiving a full parody version - "if there's a song that I think is really ripe for parody but I just can't think of a clever enough idea, sometimes it'll end up in the polka medley." Regarding their popularity, Yankovic has said, "At this point, it's sort of mandatory for me to do a polka medley. Fans would be rioting in the streets, I think, if I didn't do a polka medley." Yankovic has always asked permission from every artist whose songs compose a medley due to royalties issues. He acknowledged some influence of Spike Jones in the medleys, such as the sound effects.

Four of Yankovic's polka medleys—"Hooked on Polkas", "Polka Power!", "The Hamilton Polka", and "Polkamania!" —have been released as singles (either in international markets or domestically). "Polka Your Eyes Out" and "Polkas on 45" were also the only polkas to appear on a greatest hits album while "Polka Face" and "Polkamania!" are the only polkas to have official videos released for them that are not clips of the original songs' music videos.

In each medley, royalties are paid out to original songwriters according to the percentage of the medley directly attributable to them. What remains is then listed as "Ear Booker Polka" or various other titles so that it may be attributed to Yankovic himself.

== "Polkas on 45" ==
"Polkas on 45"

Song by "Weird Al" Yankovic

from the album "Weird Al" Yankovic in 3-D
- Released: February 28, 1984
- Recorded: December 13, 1983
- Genre: Comedy; polka
- Length: 4:23
- Label: Scotti Brothers

"Polkas on 45" is Yankovic's first recorded polka medley. It appears on his second album, In 3-D. This and "The Hot Rocks Polka" are Yankovic's only polka medleys to focus on popular rock songs from the 1960s and 1970s rather than contemporary songs, though "Polkas on 45" includes some of the latter (e.g. Talking Heads and The Police). The song title is a take on the medley-releasing novelty band Stars on 45 and their self-titled 1981 single.

The following songs are contained in the medley:

- "Beer Barrel Polka" by Jaromír Vejvoda
- "Jocko Homo" by Devo
- "Clarinet Polka"
- "Smoke on the Water" by Deep Purple
- "Sex (I'm a ...)" by Berlin
- "Hey Jude" by The Beatles
- "L.A. Woman" by the Doors
- "In-A-Gadda-Da-Vida" by Iron Butterfly
- "Hey Joe" by Jimi Hendrix
- "Burning Down the House" by Talking Heads
- "Hot Blooded" by Foreigner
- "Bubbles in the Wine" by Bob Calame (1913–1967), Lawrence Welk's long-standing theme song
- "Every Breath You Take" by The Police
- "Should I Stay or Should I Go" by The Clash
- "Jumpin' Jack Flash" by the Rolling Stones
- "My Generation" by the Who
- "Ear Booker Polka" by "Weird Al" Yankovic

Notes:

- When performing "Polkas on 45" live before the album version, "Der Kommissar" by After the Fire (originally by Falco) would be played between "Smoke on the Water" and "Sex," "1999" by Prince and "Bad Boys Get Spanked" by The Pretenders would be played instead of "Burning Down the House," and "She Blinded Me with Science" by Thomas Dolby and "Stairway to Heaven" by Led Zeppelin played instead of "Should I Stay or Should I Go," "Jumpin' Jack Flash," and "My Generation".

=== Personnel ===
According to the liner notes of The Essential "Weird Al" Yankovic:

- "Weird Al" Yankovic – lead & background vocals, accordion, group vocals, hand claps, finger snaps
- Jim West – group vocals, hand claps, finger snaps
- Steve Jay – bass guitar, banjo, group vocals, hand claps, finger snaps
- Jon "Bermuda" Schwartz – drums, sound effects, group vocals, hand claps, finger snaps
- Warren Luening – trumpet
- Joel Peskin – clarinet
- Jim Self – tuba

== "Hooked on Polkas" ==
"Hooked on Polkas"
- The Japanese sleeve of the single

Single by "Weird Al" Yankovic

from the album Dare to Be Stupid
- B-side: "I Want a New Duck"
- Released: June 18, 1985 (Japan only): Cassette single; CD single; 12-inch single
- Recorded: March 25, 1985
- Genre: Comedy; polka
- Length: 3:51
- Label: Scotti Brothers

"Weird Al" Yankovic singles chronology
"One More Minute" (1985)	"Hooked on Polkas" (1985)	"Dare to Be Stupid" (1986)

"Hooked on Polkas" is the second polka medley recorded by "Weird Al" Yankovic. It appeared on his third album, Dare to Be Stupid. The song was released as a single in Japan, with I Want a New Duck as the B-side.

Its title is a reference to the 1981 record Hooked on Classics, in which very recognizable extracts from classical music pieces were played over a continuous, more disco-style beat.

The following songs are contained in the medley:

- "Twelfth Street Rag" by Euday L. Bowman
- "State of Shock" by The Jacksons and Mick Jagger
- "Sharp Dressed Man" by ZZ Top
- "What's Love Got to Do with It" by Tina Turner
- "Method of Modern Love" by Hall & Oates
- "Owner of a Lonely Heart" by Yes
- "We're Not Gonna Take It" by Twisted Sister
- "99 Luftballons" by Nena
- "Footloose" by Kenny Loggins
- "The Reflex" by Duran Duran
- "Bang Your Head (Metal Health)" by Quiet Riot
- "Relax" by Frankie Goes to Hollywood
- "Ear Booker Polka" by "Weird Al" Yankovic

=== Single track listing ===
1. "Hooked on Polkas" – 3:51
2. "I Want a New Duck" – 3:01

== "Polka Party!" ==
"Polka Party!"

Song by "Weird Al" Yankovic

from the album Polka Party!
- Released: October 21, 1986
- Recorded: August 29, 1986
- Genre: Comedy; polka
- Length: 3:15
- Label: Scotti Brothers
- Songwriter: "Weird Al" Yankovic

"Polka Party!" is the third polka medley recorded by "Weird Al" Yankovic. It appears on his fourth album, Polka Party!.

The following songs are contained in the medley:

- "Sledgehammer" by Peter Gabriel
- "Sussudio" by Phil Collins
- "Party All the Time" by Eddie Murphy
- "Say You, Say Me" by Lionel Richie
- "Freeway of Love" by Aretha Franklin
- "What You Need" by INXS
- "Harlem Shuffle" by The Rolling Stones, originally by Bob & Earl
- "Venus" by Bananarama, originally by Shocking Blue
- "Nasty" by Janet Jackson
- "Rock Me Amadeus" by Falco
- "Shout" by Tears for Fears
- "Papa Don't Preach" by Madonna
- "Ear Booker Polka" by "Weird Al" Yankovic

Notes:

- When performing "Polka Party!" live during the opening for The Monkees tour, "Everybody Have Fun Tonight" by Wang Chung would be included between "Shout" and "Papa Don't Preach.
- During the MTV's New Years Eve 1987 Party, the "Papa Don't Preach" segment is replaced with "Everybody Have Fun Tonight" by Wang Chung.

== "The Hot Rocks Polka" ==
"The Hot Rocks Polka"

Song by "Weird Al" Yankovic

from the album UHF
- Released: July 18, 1989
- Recorded: May 24, 1989
- Genre: Comedy; polka
- Length: 4:50
- Label: Scotti Brothers
- Songwriters: Mick Jagger; Keith Richards (arr. "Weird Al" Yankovic)

"The Hot Rocks Polka" is the fourth polka medley recorded by "Weird Al" Yankovic. It appears on his sixth studio album, UHF - Original Motion Picture Soundtrack and Other Stuff. All of the songs in "The Hot Rocks Polka" medley are songs by The Rolling Stones, with the addition of Yankovic's "Ear Booker Polka" at the end. The title of the song refers to Hot Rocks 1964-1971, a greatest hits album of The Rolling Stones music.

The following songs are contained in the medley:

- "It's Only Rock 'n Roll (But I Like It)"
- "Brown Sugar"
- "You Can't Always Get What You Want"
- "Honky Tonk Women"
- "Under My Thumb"
- "Ruby Tuesday"
- "Miss You"
- "Sympathy for the Devil"
- "Get Off of My Cloud"
- "Shattered"
- "Let's Spend the Night Together"
- "(I Can't Get No) Satisfaction"
- "Ear Booker Polka" by "Weird Al" Yankovic

== "Polka Your Eyes Out" ==
"Polka Your Eyes Out"

Song by "Weird Al" Yankovic

from the album Off the Deep End
- Released: April 14, 1992
- Recorded: January 27, 1992
- Genre: Comedy; polka
- Length: 3:50
- Label: Scotti Brothers

"Polka Your Eyes Out" is the fifth polka medley by "Weird Al" Yankovic. It is included on his 1992 album, Off the Deep End, and also on his Greatest Hits Volume 2 compilation. It was first performed in 1991 at the Dr. Demento 20th Anniversary show.

The following songs are contained in the medley:

- "Cradle of Love" by Billy Idol
- "Tom's Diner" by DNA featuring Suzanne Vega
- "Love Shack" by the B-52's
- "Clarinet Polka"
- "Pump Up the Jam" by Technotronic
- "Losing My Religion" by R.E.M.
- "Unbelievable" by EMF
- "Do Me!" by Bell Biv DeVoe
- "Enter Sandman" by Metallica
- "The Humpty Dance" by Digital Underground
- "Cherry Pie" by Warrant
- "Miss You Much" by Janet Jackson
- "I Touch Myself" by Divinyls
- "Dr. Feelgood" by Mötley Crüe
- "Ice Ice Baby" by Vanilla Ice
- "Ear Booker Polka" by "Weird Al" Yankovic

== "Bohemian Polka" ==
"Bohemian Polka"

Song by "Weird Al" Yankovic

from the album Alapalooza
- Released: October 5, 1993
- Recorded: July 17, 1993
- Genre: Comedy; polka
- Length: 3:39
- Label: Scotti Brothers
- Songwriter: Freddie Mercury (arr. "Weird Al" Yankovic)

Music video
- "Bohemian Polka" on YouTube

"Bohemian Polka" is a cover of Queen's "Bohemian Rhapsody," done in Yankovic's traditional polka style. Though it primarily consists of a single song in its entirety, Yankovic's official website categorizes "Bohemian Polka" as a medley.

The following songs are contained in the medley:

- "Bohemian Rhapsody" by Queen
- "Ear Booker Polka" by "Weird Al" Yankovic

== "The Alternative Polka" ==
"The Alternative Polka"

Song by "Weird Al" Yankovic

from the album Bad Hair Day
- Released: March 12, 1996
- Recorded: January 3, 1996
- Genre: Comedy; polka
- Length: 4:50
- Label: Scotti Brothers

Music video
- "The Alternative Polka" on YouTube

"The Alternative Polka" is the seventh polka medley recorded by "Weird Al" Yankovic. It appears on his 1996 album, Bad Hair Day. The medley primarily consists of alternative rock songs, with the title being a reference to the genre.

The following songs are contained in the medley:

- "Loser" by Beck
- "Sex Type Thing" by Stone Temple Pilots
- "All I Wanna Do" by Sheryl Crow
- "Closer" by Nine Inch Nails
- "Bang and Blame" by R.E.M.
- "You Oughta Know" by Alanis Morissette
- "Bullet with Butterfly Wings" by The Smashing Pumpkins
- "Twelfth Street Rag" by Euday L. Bowman
- "My Friends" by Red Hot Chili Peppers
- "I'll Stick Around" by Foo Fighters
- "Black Hole Sun" by Soundgarden
- "Basket Case" by Green Day
- "Ear Booker Polka" by "Weird Al" Yankovic

Notes

- "The Alternative Polka" was originally going to have an interpretation of the Weezer song "Buddy Holly" between "Bullet with Butterfly Wings" and "My Friends". However, Rivers Cuomo decided against the idea at the last minute, forcing Yankovic to edit the song out of the medley. Weezer, however, was thanked in the liner notes since the layout had been prepared beforehand. Weezer later allowed Yankovic to include their hit "Beverly Hills" in the polka medley from Straight Outta Lynwood. On August 22, 2009, Yankovic released the "unmixed, physically-deleted-from-the-master-tape 'Buddy Holly' polka" on Twitter and later on YouTube.

== "Polka Power!" ==
"Polka Power!"

Promotional single by "Weird Al" Yankovic

from the album Running with Scissors
- Released: September 26, 1999 (Germany only): Cassette single; CD single
- Recorded: April 20, 1999
- Genre: Comedy; polka
- Length: 4:20
- Label: Volcano; Zomba

"Weird Al" Yankovic singles chronology
"It's All About the Pentiums" (August 4, 1999)	"Polka Power!" (1999)	"Pretty Fly for a Rabbi" (November 22, 1999)

Music video
- "Polka Power!" on YouTube

"Polka Power!" is the eighth polka medley recorded by "Weird Al" Yankovic. It appears on his 1999 album, Running with Scissors. The title of the song is a reference to "Girl Power!" a phrase made popular by the Spice Girls, the first act to be featured in the polka. The song was released as a promotional single in Germany.

The following songs are contained in the medley:

- "Twelfth Street Rag" by Euday L. Bowman
- "Wannabe" by the Spice Girls
- "Flagpole Sitta" by Harvey Danger
- "Ghetto Supastar (That Is What You Are)" by Pras featuring Ol' Dirty Bastard and Mýa
- "Everybody (Backstreet's Back)" by the Backstreet Boys
- "Walkin' on the Sun" by Smash Mouth
- "Intergalactic" by the Beastie Boys
- "Tubthumping" by Chumbawamba
- "Ray of Light" by Madonna
- "Push" by Matchbox Twenty
- "Semi-Charmed Life" by Third Eye Blind
- "The Dope Show" by Marilyn Manson
- "MMMBop" by Hanson
- "Sex and Candy" by Marcy Playground
- "Closing Time" by Semisonic
- "W.A.Y. Moby Polka" by "Weird Al" Yankovic

== "Angry White Boy Polka" ==
"Angry White Boy Polka"

Song by "Weird Al" Yankovic

from the album Poodle Hat
- Released: May 20, 2003
- Recorded: March 21, 2003
- Genre: Comedy; polka
- Length: 5:04
- Label: Volcano

Music video
- "Angry White Boy Polka" on YouTube

The "Angry White Boy Polka" is the ninth polka medley recorded by "Weird Al" Yankovic. It appears on his 2003 album Poodle Hat and consists of Christian metal, nu metal, rap metal, garage rock, and rap tracks performed primarily by white males; however, members from groups System of a Down, Rage Against the Machine and P.O.D. are multiracial and drummers Meg White of The White Stripes and Stefanie Eulinberg of Kid Rock's band are female. Rage Against the Machine would have their style parodied on the 2006 track "I'll Sue Ya" from Straight Outta Lynwood.

The following are contained in the medley:

- "Last Resort" by Papa Roach
- "Chop Suey!" by System of a Down
- "Get Free" by The Vines
- "Hate to Say I Told You So" by The Hives
- "Fell in Love with a Girl" by The White Stripes
- "Last Nite" by The Strokes
- "Down with the Sickness" by Disturbed
- "Renegades of Funk" by Rage Against the Machine, originally by Afrika Bambaataa
- "My Way" by Limp Bizkit
- "Outside" by Staind
- "Bawitdaba" by Kid Rock
- "Youth of the Nation" by P.O.D.
- "The Real Slim Shady" by Eminem
- "Poodle Hat Polka" by "Weird Al" Yankovic

Notes

- One song that Yankovic wanted to include was "Freak on a Leash" by Korn, but amongst other songs, it was denied by the band.

== "Polkarama!" ==
"Polkarama!"

Song by "Weird Al" Yankovic

from the album Straight Outta Lynwood
- Released: September 24, 2006
- Recorded: April 12, 2006
- Genre: Comedy; polka
- Length: 4:17
- Label: Volcano

Music video
- "Polkarama!" on YouTube

"Polkarama!" is the tenth polka medley by "Weird Al" Yankovic. It was released on his 2006 album, Straight Outta Lynwood.

The following songs are contained in the medley:

- "Chicken Dance" by Werner Thomas
- "Let's Get It Started" by Black Eyed Peas
- "Take Me Out" by Franz Ferdinand
- "Beverly Hills" by Weezer
- "Speed of Sound" by Coldplay
- "Float On" by Modest Mouse
- "Feel Good Inc." by Gorillaz featuring De La Soul
- "Don't Cha" by The Pussycat Dolls featuring Busta Rhymes
- "Somebody Told Me" by The Killers
- "Slither" by Velvet Revolver
- "Candy Shop" by 50 Cent featuring Olivia
- "Drop It Like It's Hot" by Snoop Dogg featuring Pharrell Williams
- "Pon de Replay" by Rihanna
- "Gold Digger" by Kanye West featuring Jamie Foxx
- "The Nina Bobina Polka" by "Weird Al" Yankovic

Notes

- "Polkarama!" was used as the set opener for Yankovic's 2007-08 Straight Outta Lynwood tour.
- Yankovic initially wanted to include a verse of "Photograph" by Nickelback, and even got the band's permission. However, since he was unable "to find a way to incorporate the song into 'Polkarama' where it didn't sound wedged in or tacked on," Yankovic decided not to use it, but still thanked Nickelback in the liner notes for the album.

== "Polka Face" ==
"Polka Face"

Song by "Weird Al" Yankovic

from the album Alpocalypse
- Released: June 21, 2011
- Recorded: May 8, 2010
- Genre: Comedy; polka
- Length: 4:47
- Label: Volcano

Music video
- "Polka Face" on YouTube

"Polka Face" is the eleventh Weird Al polka medley. It was performed in concert in 2010, and was released on the 2011 album Alpocalypse. The medley consists of then-recent dance-pop, hip hop, and R&B songs. This was the last polka to feature Warren Leuning on the trumpet before his death in 2012.

The following songs are contained in the medley:

- "Liechtensteiner Polka" by Will Glahé
- "Poker Face" by Lady Gaga
- "Womanizer" by Britney Spears
- "Right Round" by Flo Rida ft. Ke$ha
- "Day 'n' Nite" by Kid Cudi
- "Need You Now" by Lady Antebellum
- "Baby" by Justin Bieber ft. Ludacris
- "So What" by Pink
- "I Kissed a Girl" by Katy Perry
- "Fireflies" by Owl City
- "Blame It" by Jamie Foxx ft. T-Pain
- "Replay" by Iyaz
- "Down" by Jay Sean ft. Lil Wayne
- "Break Your Heart" by Taio Cruz ft. Ludacris
- "The Tick Tock Polka" by Frankie Yankovic
- "Tik Tok" by Kesha
- "Poker Face" (Reprise) by Lady Gaga
- "Whatever's Left Over Polka" by "Weird Al" Yankovic

The title is a reference to Lady Gaga's song "Poker Face".

On September 25, 2011, Comedy Central's website Jokes.com premiered an animated music video for this polka medley. The video features a distinctive animation style for each of the segments of the parody. Some are Flash-animated ("Right Round", "Baby", "Blame It", "Break Your Heart", and "I Kissed a Girl"), created by Wachtenheim/Marianetti Animation of TV Funhouse. Others contain cut-out ("Fireflies"), hand-drawn ("Down"), stop-motion ("Womanizer"), and experimental scribbling animation ("Replay").

=== Weekly chart positions ===
Chart (2011)	Peak position
US Comedy Digital Tracks (Billboard)	6

== "Now That's What I Call Polka!" ==
"Now That's What I Call Polka!"

Song by "Weird Al" Yankovic

from the album Mandatory Fun
- Released: July 15, 2014
- Recorded: April 15, 2014
- Genre: Comedy; polka
- Length: 4:06
- Label: RCA

"Now That's What I Call Polka!" is the twelfth polka medley recorded by "Weird Al" Yankovic. It appears on his 2014 album Mandatory Fun, and the title of the medley is the parody of compilation album series Now That's What I Call Music!. Wayne Bergeron replaces the late Warren Leuning on trumpet.

The following songs are included in the medley:

- "Too Fat Polka" by Arthur Godfrey
- "Wrecking Ball" by Miley Cyrus
- "Pumped Up Kicks" by Foster the People
- "Best Song Ever" by One Direction
- "Gangnam Style" by Psy
- "Call Me Maybe" by Carly Rae Jepsen
- "Scream & Shout" by will.i.am feat. Britney Spears
- "Somebody That I Used to Know" by Gotye feat. Kimbra
- "Timber" by Pitbull feat. Kesha
- "Sexy and I Know It" by LMFAO
- "Thrift Shop" by Macklemore & Ryan Lewis feat. Wanz
- "Get Lucky" by Daft Punk feat. Pharrell Williams
- "Mandatory Polka" by "Weird Al" Yankovic

=== Weekly chart positions ===
Chart (2014)	Peak position
US Comedy Digital Tracks (Billboard)	4

== "The Hamilton Polka" ==
"The Hamilton Polka"

Single by "Weird Al" Yankovic
- Released: March 1, 2018
- Recorded: February 13, 2018
- Genre: Comedy; polka
- Length: 5:01
- Label: Atlantic
- Songwriter: Lin-Manuel Miranda

"Weird Al" Yankovic singles chronology
"Captain Underpants Theme Song" (2017)	"The Hamilton Polka" (2018)	"Who's Gonna Stop Me" (2020)

Music video
- "The Hamilton Polka" on YouTube

"The Hamilton Polka" is the thirteenth polka medley recorded by "Weird Al" Yankovic, and the first not to be recorded for a studio album of his. It was released on March 1, 2018, as a digital single and is composed primarily of songs from the Broadway musical Hamilton, written by Lin-Manuel Miranda and based on the life of Alexander Hamilton. The song was released as part of Miranda's "Hamildrop" series.

The following songs are included in the medley:

- "Alexander Hamilton"
- "Wait for It"
- "The Schuyler Sisters"
- "Yorktown (The World Turned Upside Down)"
- "Dear Theodosia"
- "You'll Be Back"
- "The Room Where It Happens"
- "Right Hand Man"
- "Guns and Ships"
- "Washington on Your Side"
- "Helpless"
- "Non-Stop"
- "History Has Its Eyes on You"
- "My Shot"
- "Alexander Hamilton" (reprise version)
- "Ear Booker Polka" by "Weird Al" Yankovic

== "Polkamania!" ==
"Polkamania!"

Single by "Weird Al" Yankovic
- Released: July 19, 2024
- Recorded: June 4, 2024
- Genre: Comedy; polka
- Length: 4:06
- Label: Ear Booker

"Weird Al" Yankovic singles chronology
"Now You Know" (2022)	"Polkamania!" (2024)

Music video
- "Polkamania!" on YouTube

"Polkamania!" is the fourteenth polka medley recorded by "Weird Al" Yankovic. It was released on July 19, 2024, to celebrate the tenth anniversary of his album Mandatory Fun. On the same day, an animated music video was premiered in the same style of the music video for "Polka Face" featuring animations by Bill Plympton, Vivienne Medrano, Liam Lynch, Victor Yerrid, Cyriak, Wachtenheim/Marianetti Animation, and Ryan Krzak (notable for his popular, fan-made animated music videos for other "Weird Al" songs), as well as numerous other artists. The medley consists of number-one Billboard Hot 100 hits in the ten years since Yankovic released Mandatory Fun.

The following songs are included in the medley:

- "Helena Polka (Al's Version)"
- "Bad Guy" by Billie Eilish
- "Hello" by Adele
- "Flowers" by Miley Cyrus
- "We Don't Talk About Bruno" written by Lin-Manuel Miranda and performed by the cast of Encanto
- "Vampire" by Olivia Rodrigo
- "Old Town Road" by Lil Nas X feat. Billy Ray Cyrus
- "Despacito" by Luis Fonsi feat. Daddy Yankee
- "Shape of You" by Ed Sheeran
- "Uptown Funk" by Mark Ronson feat. Bruno Mars
- "WAP" by Cardi B feat. Megan Thee Stallion
- "Thank U, Next" by Ariana Grande
- "Shake It Off" by Taylor Swift
- "Ear Booker Polka" by "Weird Al" Yankovic

Notes:

- According to an interview, Yankovic wanted to include a verse of "Kill Bill" by SZA, but received no response from her. The lyrics, though, were mistakenly left in on Apple Music between "Thank U, Next" and "Shake It Off".
- Another song considered was "Espresso" by Sabrina Carpenter, but the song was left out due to not hitting number one while Yankovic was working on the medley.

== Others ==
- A polka medley performed at a 1982 Missing Persons concert is considered to be the first official Yankovic polka medley. It included the songs "Jocko Homo" by Devo, "Homosapien" by Pete Shelley, "Sex Junkie" by The Plasmatics, "T.V.O.D." by The Normal, "Bad Boys Get Spanked" by The Pretenders, "TV Party" by Black Flag, "Janitor" by Suburban Lawns, and "People Who Died" by The Jim Carroll Band. ("Jocko Homo" was later re-used in "Polkas on 45".)
- A 1986 television special Weird Al's Guide to the Grammys featured Yankovic and fellow accordionist Frankie Yankovic (no relation) performing a short polka medley of Grammy nominees. It included the songs "Born in the USA" by Bruce Springsteen, "Money for Nothing" by Dire Straits, "The Boys of Summer" by Don Henley, "The Power of Love" by Huey Lewis and the News and "We Are the World" by USA for Africa.
- According to Yankovic's drummer, Jon "Bermuda" Schwartz, a U2 polka was planned for Even Worse, but was left off the album due to licensing issues. U2's music would be parodied on Bad Hair Day in "Cavity Search", a parody of "Hold Me, Thrill Me, Kiss Me, Kill Me".
- In 1991, Yankovic appeared on an episode of FOX's The Sunday Comics performing a polka medley featuring songs from "Polkas on 45" and "Polka Your Eyes Out". It included "Cradle of Love", "Tom's Diner", "Love Shack", "Clarinet Polka", "Pump Up The Jam", "Hey Jude", "In-A-Gadda-Da-Vida", "Hey Joe", "Burning Down the House", "The Humpty Dance", "Cherry Pie", "Miss You Much", "Jumpin' Jack Flash", and "My Generation".
- In 1995, Al performed accordion and the backing vocal part on "Who Stole the Kishka?" on one of Frankie Yankovic's final records, Songs of the Polka King, Vol. 1.
- "Polkamon", an original polka song which lists the names of several dozen Pokémon creatures, is one of the ending themes for the English dub of Pokémon The Movie 2000: The Power of One, and is featured on the film's soundtrack.
- In 2018, Yankovic remixed "Feel It Still" and "Live in the Moment" by Portugal. The Man from their album Woodstock, adding a polka backing track and additional vocals.
- In 2022, the soundtrack album to the film Weird: The Al Yankovic Story included Yankovic performing a 35-second solo instrumental rendition of "Clarinet Polka" on the accordion. A 19-second snippet of a portion of the Ramones' "Beat on the Brat" on the soundtrack features some accordion polka riffing, over a punk-rock arrangement.
- 2024 saw Al contribute to "New Year's Eve Polka (5-4-3-2-1)" on Jimmy Fallon's album Holiday Seasoning with The Roots.

== Reception ==
Yankovic's polka medleys are often well received by fans, with some calling them "a staple of his albums" and "often featured as a highlight for fans of his unique musical style and comedic sensibilities". However, some polka musicians such as The Dreadnoughts have criticized them, saying that they "unwittingly [teach] the next two generations that polka is just a mashup comedy style".

== See also ==
- List of songs recorded by "Weird Al" Yankovic
- Polka in the United States
