= Everything You Know Is Wrong (disambiguation) =

Everything You Know Is Wrong is a 1974 comedy album by the Firesign Theatre.

Everything You Know Is Wrong may also refer to:

== Music ==
- "Everything You Know Is Wrong", a song on Bad Hair Day by "Weird Al" Yankovic, 1996
- "Everything You Know Is Wrong", a song on Un by Chumbawamba, 2004
- "Everything You Know is Wrong", a song by Prurient on NOISE, 2016
- "Everything You Know is Wrong", a song on Pop Voodoo by Black Grape, 2017

== Literature ==
- Everything You Know Is Wrong, a book by Paul Kirchner, 1995
- Everything You Know Is Wrong, a book by Lloyd Pye, 1997
- Everything You Know Is Wrong, a book by Russ Kick, 2002
