= Jerry Springer (disambiguation) =

Jerry Springer (1944–2023) was an American television presenter.

Jerry Springer may also refer to:

- The Jerry Springer Show, a tabloid talk show presented by Springer
- Jerry Springer: The Opera, a British musical inspired by the talk show
- "Jerry Springer", a song from "Weird Al" Yankovic's 1999 album Running with Scissors
