= Bad Hair Day =

1996 studio album by "Weird Al" Yankovic

Studio album by "Weird Al" Yankovic
- Released: March 12, 1996
- Recorded: November 30, 1994–January 15, 1996
- Genres: Comedy; comedy rock; parody
- Length: 42:13
- Labels: Rock 'n Roll, Scotti Brothers
- Producer: "Weird Al" Yankovic

"Weird Al" Yankovic chronology
The TV Album (1995)	Bad Hair Day (1996)	Running with Scissors (1999)

Singles from Bad Hair Day
- 1. "Amish Paradise" Released: March 12, 1996; 2. "Gump" Released: May 7, 1996; 3. "The Night Santa Went Crazy" Released: November 26, 1996

Bad Hair Day is the ninth studio album by the American parody musician "Weird Al" Yankovic, released on March 12, 1996. It was Yankovic's last studio album for the Scotti Brothers label before it was purchased by Volcano Entertainment in 1999. The album produced an array of hit comedy singles; lead single "Amish Paradise", which lampoons both Coolio's "Gangsta's Paradise" and the Amish lifestyle, charted at No. 53 on the Billboard Hot 100, while "Gump", which parodies "Lump" by the Presidents of the United States of America and the movie Forrest Gump, peaked at No. 102.

The musical styles on the album are built around parodies and pastiches of pop and rock music of the mid-1990s, largely targeting alternative rock and hip-hop alike. The album also includes style parodies, imitations of specific artists like They Might Be Giants and Elvis Costello. "Amish Paradise" caused a minor controversy after rapper Coolio expressed distaste at having his song parodied by Yankovic, although the two later made amends. Bad Hair Day was the final studio album to feature "Weird Al" Yankovic's signature look of curly hair, glasses, and a mustache, an appearance he had maintained since 1979.

Bad Hair Day was met with mixed to positive reviews, with many critics praising "Amish Paradise" in particular; "Amish Paradise" went on to become one of Yankovic's best-known singles. The album peaked at No. 14 on the Billboard 200. Bad Hair Day sold 1,317,000 copies in the U.S. in 1996 alone, the highest sales tally for any comedy album in a single calendar year since Nielsen SoundScan began tracking sales in 1991. Bad Hair Day was Yankovic's sixth Gold record in the United States, and went on to be certified Double Platinum for sales of over two million copies in the U.S. by the Recording Industry Association of America (RIAA). The album was also certified Platinum in Canada by the Canadian Recording Industry Association (CRIA).

== Production ==
=== Recording ===
In November 1994, Yankovic entered Santa Monica Sound Recorders in Santa Monica, California, to begin the first of the Bad Hair Day sessions, which he produced himself. Recording with Yankovic were Jon "Bermuda" Schwartz on drums, Steve Jay on bass, and Jim West on guitar. The album was recorded in five sessions. The first session started on November 30 and yielded two originals: "Callin' In Sick" and "Everything You Know Is Wrong". The second session started the next day and produced the original songs: "I Remember Larry", "The Night Santa Went Crazy", and "Since You've Been Gone". The third session took place on November 5, 1995, and resulted in the original "I'm So Sick of You" and the parody "Cavity Search". The fourth session yielded "The Alternative Polka" medley, and the two parodies "Gump" and "Phony Calls". The fifth and final recording session produced "Amish Paradise" and "Syndicated Inc.", both of which were parodies.

=== Originals ===
"Callin' In Sick" is a style parody of music popular in Seattle, Washington, most notably grunge. "Everything You Know Is Wrong" is a stylistic pastiche of They Might Be Giants. Yankovic explained that he "tried to write a song sort of in their style, but perhaps even a little bit more twisted". For fans of They Might Be Giants, he put "little references in here and there, little allusions to other songs of theirs". The song title is taken from the 1974 Firesign Theatre album of the same name.

"I Remember Larry" is a style parody of Hilly Michaels, and it tells the tale of a neighborhood bully who, after myriad pranks, drives the narrator to kidnap him and leave him for dead in the forest. At the 3:10 mark, the song contains a backmasked message, which when reversed reads, "Wow, you must have an awful lot of free time on your hands". "The Night Santa Went Crazy" tells the story of Santa snapping, embarking on a killing spree, and eventually being arrested. Originally, the song had a different third verse, differing in the fact that, at the end of the song, Santa is killed by the SWAT team. The "Extra Gory" version was eventually released on the single for "Amish Paradise". Another version was written for the Touring with Scissors tour in 1999, combining elements of the album version and the "Extra Gory" version. "Since You've Been Gone" is a generic doo-wop a cappella track that details a lover's torment after the object of his affections breaks up with him. Yankovic performed most of the vocals himself, and to make sure that he stayed on key, a scratch guitar track was recorded; when the song was mixed, the guitar track was removed. Bassist Steve Jay provides the low voices in the song. Finally, "I'm So Sick of You", a style parody of Elvis Costello in which the singer tells his girlfriend all the things he hates about her.

=== Parodies and polka ===
The first parody recorded for the album was "Cavity Search", a parody of U2's hit "Hold Me, Thrill Me, Kiss Me, Kill Me". The song, which recounts the horror of having to go to the dentist, features the sound of an actual dental drill. To enhance the dental theme of the song, Yankovic called in his actual dentist, who brought a real drill and a human tooth, which the two took turns drilling while recording. The second parody was a pastiche of TLC's hit "Waterfalls" called "Phony Calls", about prank calls. During the bridge, a clip from The Simpsons second season episode "Blood Feud" is played on top of the music. Because the sound clip was from a preexisting episode, Yankovic noted that "it was a pretty sweet deal for the Simpsons' voice actors – they each got a nice pile of money, and they didn't even have to come to the studio!" Before the call you hear a phone number being dialed. The number is 372-5806, which at the time was guitarist Jim West's home phone number. The next parody recorded for the album was "Gump", a parody of "Lump" by the Presidents of the United States of America. The song recounts the basic plot to the 1994 film Forrest Gump about a naïve and slow-witted yet athletically prodigious native of Alabama who witnesses, and in some cases influences, some of the defining events of the latter half of the 20th century in the United States. "Gump" was released as the second single from the album, and received a video.

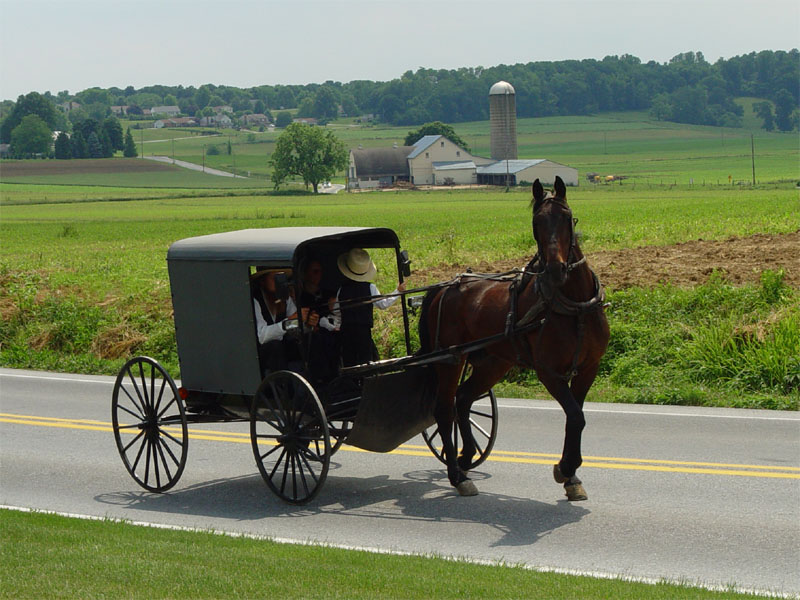
In "Amish Paradise", Yankovic raps about the simple Amish way of life in an ironically boastful style.

On January 15, 1996, Yankovic began recording the lead single for the album, "Amish Paradise". Yankovic felt that parodying Coolio would pay off, because Coolio had "such an identifiable image that a lot of things could be done [with]". He noted, "I like to play around with people that have some- you know, a lot of style as opposed to somebody who's kind of homogonized [sic] and bland and has no personality, and Coolio certainly kind of sticks out in a crowd." Yankovic felt that juxtaposing the original song's "gangsta" themes with the Amish lifestyle would produce a humorous end result. After Yankovic revealed to his label that he would be doing a Coolio parody, they requested that the album artwork for the release also parody Coolio. Yankovic had been toying with the name Bad Hair Day for a time and felt that he could adequately use the name and lampoon Coolio – who was known for his distinct hair style – at the same time. The final parody recorded for the album, "Syndicated Inc.", is a parody of "Misery" by Soul Asylum, a loving ode to syndicated television.

Much like Yankovic's previous album, Bad Hair Day features a polka medley of then-current hit songs, "The Alternative Polka". "The Alternative Polka" originally contained the chorus of Weezer's song "Buddy Holly" performed by Yankovic, but the song's writer, Weezer front man Rivers Cuomo, requested its removal just before the album's release. Yankovic was forced to physically cut the bit out of the master tape, but Weezer was still given credit in the liner notes because the notes were already printed. On June 25, 2010, over 14 years after the album's release, Yankovic released the un-mixed and un-mastered "Buddy Holly" clip on his official YouTube channel.

=== Unused parodies ===
In addition to the five parodies on the album, Yankovic had several parody ideas that were turned down. Originally, Yankovic wanted to turn the Offspring's hit "Come Out and Play" into an ode about doing laundry called "Laundry Day". There are conflicting stories as to why the song was never recorded; either Yankovic never approached the Offspring about releasing the parody, or the band denied permission. Either way, Yankovic performed the song in concert from 1996 through 2000. Despite not being able to parody "Come Out and Play", Yankovic would later be granted permission to parody their 1998 hit "Pretty Fly (For a White Guy)" as "Pretty Fly for a Rabbi" on his 1999 album Running with Scissors. Yankovic also wanted to record a parody of the Beatles' Anthology hit "Free as a Bird" titled "Gee, I'm a Nerd". Yankovic asked Paul McCartney, a supporter of Yankovic's work, if he could parody "Free as a Bird". McCartney had no problem with the parody, but because "Free as a Bird" was written by John Lennon, McCartney deferred the decision to Yoko Ono, who denied permission because she was uncomfortable with the parody idea.

Yankovic had also intended to record a parody of the U2 song "Numb" and a parody of the Rembrandts's hit song "I'll Be There for You". The "Numb" spoof would have been called "Green Eggs and Ham", a song in which Yankovic recited various lines from the Dr. Seuss book of the same name. U2 approved the parody, but Yankovic was unable to get permission from the Seuss estate. Likewise, Yankovic had wanted to turn "I'll Be There for You" into "I'll Repair For You", and write it about the popular 1990s sitcom Home Improvement. The Rembrandts had also given approval when Yankovic asked, but the producers of Friends did not want the theme song to get overexposed and refused permission. All of the rejected parodies were later performed in concert.

== Controversy ==
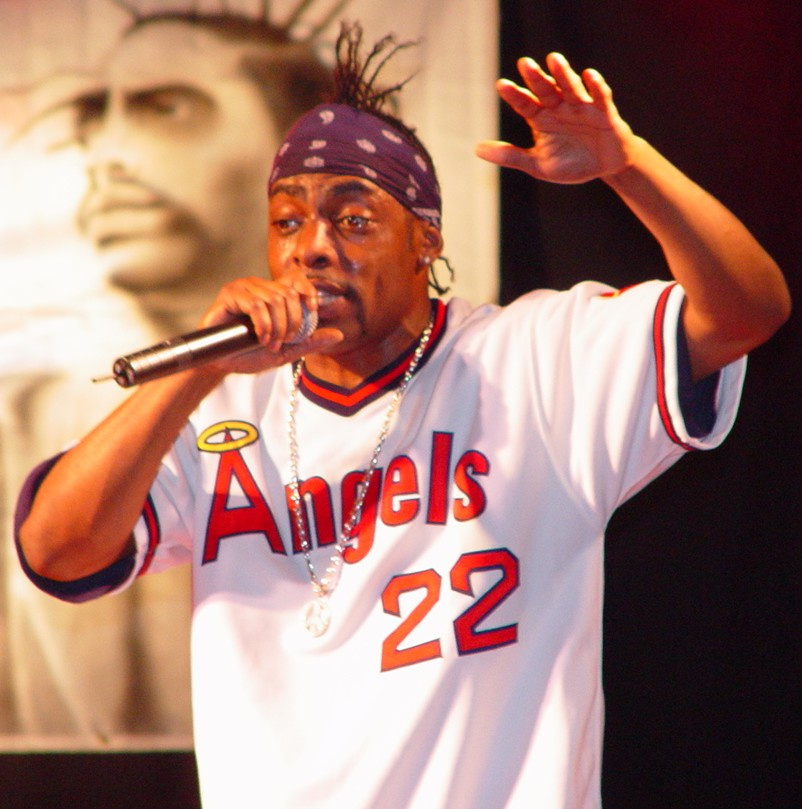
Coolio felt that "Amish Paradise" "desecrat[ed]" his song

The album's lead single, "Amish Paradise", caused a minor controversy after rapper Coolio said that Yankovic had never asked for permission to record the parody. Yankovic traditionally secures permission from the artists he parodies, even though this is not legally required, as parodies are covered under fair use guidelines, but when he inquired about "Gangsta's Paradise", Yankovic was told by Scotti Brothers Records that Coolio had given permission. Coolio later claimed that he had not given such permission, making a statement at the Grammys saying that he did not appreciate Yankovic "desecrating" his song.

Speculation surfaced that Coolio had actually given permission but later changed his mind, or that Yankovic's record label had lied to Yankovic in the hopes that the song would become popular. Yankovic later stated on VH1's Behind the Music that he had written a sincere letter of apology to Coolio which was never returned, and that Coolio never complained when he received his royalty check from proceeds of the song. A series of photos taken at the XM Satellite Radio booth at the 2006 Consumer Electronics Show, as well as a post on the "Ask Al" feature on Yankovic's website, suggested that Yankovic and Coolio made amends. According to Yankovic, he was very surprised when Coolio came over to chat. He later joked on his site's Q&A feature that, "I doubt I'll be invited to Coolio's next birthday party but at least I can stop wearing that bulletproof vest to the mall."

== Promotion ==
Scotti Brothers Records developed a promotion strategy for Bad Hair Day, which included Yankovic dressing up in exaggerated Coolio-styled hair and presenting an award at the American Music Awards in January 1996. According to Billboard, this was "a hint as to who would be the next victim of a Yankovic parody". "Amish Paradise" was then released in the very beginning of March as a radio and commercial single, when "Gangsta's Paradise" was still receiving radio airplay. Four days later, the video was released. The album's success was also bolstered by the release of "Gump" as a single on April 25, and a video four days later. In addition, WEA, who had taken over distributing Scotti Brothers' albums from BMG, helped with the initial release of the album.

To promote the album, Yankovic undertook the "Bad Hair Tour", which spanned from May 24, 1996, to October 19, 1997. The tour was largely centered in the United States, although the first half saw Yankovic perform in Canada. Yankovic performed over 130 shows during the tour. Initially, there were preliminary plans to have Yankovic tour Europe, based on whether All American Music Group would secure the album's international release, although this venture never came to fruition.

== Reception ==
=== Critical reception ===
Professional ratings
Review scores
Source	Rating
AllMusic	2/5 stars
The Baltimore Sun	positive
Pitchfork	6.8/10
Pittsburgh Post-Gazette	3/4 stars
Rolling Stone	2/5 stars
The Washington Post	positive

Mike Joyce of The Washington Post wrote that "Amish Paradise" was "by far the cleverest and funniest track that Bad Hair Day has to offer [and] it ranks right up there with such Yankovic classics as 'Another One Rides the Bus', 'Smells Like Nirvana' and 'Eat It'." He also enjoyed "Gump", but felt that the remainder of the parodies were weak, particularly citing "Cavity Search" as "a sophomoric attempt to extract yuks". However, Joyce noted that "some of the biggest laugh-getters" on the album were Yankovic's originals.

A record review from the Pittsburgh Post-Gazette concluded that "'Weird Al' Yankovic's ninth collection of original songs and parodies reinforces his reign as pop music's King of Comedy", and that the record "showcases Yankovic's unparalleled ability to capture the styles of other bands and turn boring pop songs into fun tunes." J. D. Considine of The Baltimore Sun noted that while Yankovic's music can be "sophomoric and silly", Yankovic himself "can also be pretty smart". The review highlighted, among other songs, "The Alternative Polka" and "The Night Santa Went Crazy", as some of the album's best songs.

Not all reviews were positive. Stephen Thomas Erlewine of AllMusic criticized the lack of humor on the album saying "the music on Bad Hair Day not only lacks the humor, it lacks the impish energy that made Weird Al's first albums such fun." The Rolling Stone Record Guide awarded the album two out of five stars. However, the book later referred to the album's lead single, "Amish Paradise", as "gut-busting."

=== Commercial performance ===
Bad Hair Day was released on March 12, 1996, and eventually became Yankovic's best selling album. Domestically, the album debuted at number 28 on the Billboard 200 on March 30, 1996. It eventually peaked at number 14. The album remained on the chart for a total of 56 weeks, making it Yankovic's longest-charting album. In 1996 alone, the album sold 1,317,000 copies in the United States, setting a record for the most copies a comedy album sold in a year during the Nielsen SoundScan era. On May 15, 1996, Recording Industry Association of America (RIAA) certified Bad Hair Day gold, and then on June 11 of the same year, it certified the record platinum. In May 2014, it was announced that the album had sold 2.025 million copies in the U.S., making it the fourth best selling comedy album of the Nielsen Soundscan era. On October 3, 2019, the album was officially certified double-platinum by the RIAA.

The album was also successful in Canada, where it peaked at No. 9 on the Canadian Albums Chart, and was later certified Platinum by the Canadian Recording Industry Association (CRIA), for sales over 100,000 copies.

== Track listing ==
No.	Title	Writer(s)	Parody of	Length
1.	"Amish Paradise"	Artis Ivey Jr., Doug Rasheed, Larry Sanders, Stevland Morris, Alfred Yankovic	"Gangsta's Paradise" by Coolio feat. L.V.	3:20
2.	"Everything You Know Is Wrong"	Yankovic	Style parody of They Might Be Giants	3:47
3.	"Cavity Search"	Paul Hewson, David Evans, Adam Clayton, Laurence Mullen Jr., Yankovic	"Hold Me, Thrill Me, Kiss Me, Kill Me" by U2	4:16
4.	"Callin' In Sick"	Yankovic	Original grunge song	3:41
5.	"The Alternative Polka"	Various	A polka medley including: "Loser" by Beck; "Sex Type Thing" by Stone Temple Pilots; "All I Wanna Do" by Sheryl Crow; "Closer" by Nine Inch Nails; "Bang and Blame" by R.E.M.; "You Oughta Know" by Alanis Morissette; "Bullet with Butterfly Wings" by The Smashing Pumpkins; "My Friends" by Red Hot Chili Peppers; "I'll Stick Around" by Foo Fighters; "Black Hole Sun" by Soundgarden; "Basket Case" by Green Day; "Ear Booker Polka" by "Weird Al" Yankovic	5:00
6.	"Since You've Been Gone"	Yankovic	Original a capella song	1:20
7.	"Gump"	Christopher Ballew, Yankovic	"Lump" by the Presidents of the United States of America	2:11
8.	"I'm So Sick of You"	Yankovic	Style parody of Elvis Costello	3:25
9.	"Syndicated Inc."	David Pirner, Yankovic	"Misery" by Soul Asylum	3:46
10.	"I Remember Larry"	Yankovic	Style parody of Hilly Michaels	3:55
11.	"Phony Calls"	Marqueze Etheridge, Lisa Lopes, Organized Noize, Yankovic	"Waterfalls" by TLC	3:21
12.	"The Night Santa Went Crazy"	Yankovic	Style Parody of Soul Asylum, specifically, "Black Gold."	3:59
Total length:				42:13

== Outtakes ==
Song	Length	Release(s)
"Spy Hard"	2:49	B-side of "Gump" Later released as its own single
"The Night Santa Went Crazy (Extra Gory Version)"	3:59	B-side of "Amish Paradise" Later released on The Essential "Weird Al" Yankovic

== Personnel ==
Credits adapted from CD liner notes.

Band members

- "Weird Al" Yankovic – lead and background vocals, keyboards, accordion
- Jim West – guitars, banjo, background vocals
- Steve Jay – bass guitar, background vocals
- Jon "Bermuda" Schwartz – drums, percussion

Additional musicians

- Rubén Valtierra – keyboards
- Warren Luening – trumpet
- Joel Peskin – clarinet
- Tommy Johnson – tuba
- Gary Herbig – baritone saxophone
- Lisa Popeil – background vocals
- Nancy Cartwright – voice of Bart Simpson
- Hank Azaria – voice of Moe the Bartender

Technical

- "Weird Al" Yankovic – producer, arranger
- Tony Papa – engineer, mixing
- Colin Sauers – assistant engineer
- Doug Haverty – art direction
- Command A Studios – design
- Carl Studna – photography
- Roseanne McIlvane – bad hair
- Bernie Grundman – mastering

== Charts ==
=== Weekly charts ===
Weekly chart performance for Bad Hair Day
Chart (1996)	Peak position
US Billboard 200	14

=== Year-end charts ===
Year-end chart performance for Bad Hair Day
Chart (1996)	Position
US Billboard 200	44

== Certifications ==
Region	Certification	Certified units/sales
Canada (Music Canada)	Platinum	100,000^{^}
United States (RIAA)	2× Platinum	2,000,000^{‡}
^{^} Shipments figures based on certification alone.^{‡} Sales+streaming figures based on certification alone.

== Bad Hair Day: The Videos ==
Bad Hair Day: The Videos

Video by "Weird Al" Yankovic
- Released: June 4, 1996
- Length: 15 minutes (VHS)
- Label: Scotti Brothers
- Directors: Jay Levey; "Weird Al" Yankovic
- Producers: "Weird Al" Yankovic; Rick Derringer

"Weird Al" Yankovic video chronology
Alapalooza: The Videos (1994)	Bad Hair Day: The Videos (1996)	"Weird Al" Yankovic: The Videos (1998)

Bad Hair Day: The Videos is a VHS release of four of "Weird Al" Yankovic's music videos, directed by Jay Levey and Yankovic. It was released by Scotti Brothers Records on June 4, 1996. The latter two videos, "Headline News" and "Money for Nothing/Beverly Hillbillies*," are not from Bad Hair Day, but instead bonus videos from Permanent Record: Al in the Box and UHF, respectively.

=== Track listing ===
Bad Hair Day: The Videos track listing
No.	Title	Director(s)	Length
1.	"Amish Paradise" (Bad Hair Day)	"Weird Al" Yankovic
2.	"Gump" (Bad Hair Day)	"Weird Al" Yankovic
3.	"Headline News" (Permanent Record: Al in the Box)	"Weird Al" Yankovic
4.	"Money for Nothing/Beverly Hillbillies*" (UHF)	Jay Levey

=== Charts ===
Chart performance for Bad Hair Day: The Videos
Chart (1996)	Peak position
US Top Music Videos (Billboard)	1

=== Certifications ===
Certifications for Bad Hair Day: The Videos
Region	Certification	Certified units/sales
United States (RIAA)	Gold	50,000^{^}
^{^} Shipments figures based on certification alone.

== Sources ==
- Rabin, Nathan; Yankovic, Al (2012). Weird Al: The Book. New York: Abrams Books. ISBN 978-1419704352.
