= It's All About the Pentiums =

1999 single by "Weird Al" Yankovic

Single by "Weird Al" Yankovic

from the album Running with Scissors
- B-side: "The Saga Begins"
- Released: August 4, 1999
- Recorded: April 19, 1999
- Studio: Hollywood Bowl
- Genre: Hard rock; comedy rock; comedy hip-hop; rap rock; nerdcore
- Length: 3:34
- Label: Volcano
- Songwriters: Sean Combs; Sean Jacobs; Jason Phillips; David Styles; Christopher Wallace; Kimberly Jones; Deric Angelettie; Alfred Yankovic
- Producer: "Weird Al" Yankovic

"Weird Al" Yankovic singles chronology
"The Saga Begins" (1999)	"It's All About the Pentiums" (1999)	"Polka Power!" (1999)

Music video
- ”It’s All About The Pentiums” on YouTube

"It's All About the Pentiums" is a song by "Weird Al" Yankovic. It is a parody of "It's All About the Benjamins (Rock Remix)" by Sean "Puff Daddy" Combs and focuses on the narrator's obsession with his computer's hardware. The name of the song reflects this in its title with its referral to the Pentium line of Intel microprocessor chips that were popular in the late nineties. It was also one of the last songs recorded for the album Running With Scissors.

== Track listing ==
1. "It's All About the Pentiums" – 3:34
2. "The Saga Begins" – 5:28
3. "The Saga Begins" (Music video)

== Writing ==
Yankovic spoke to Sean Combs personally on the phone to make sure that the parody would not emulate the 1996 Coolio incident. Yankovic has admitted to writing the song a few days before the entire album had to be mastered:

"I almost always record the lead vocals first. The only exception that comes to mind is "It's All About the Pentiums." I had pitched Puff Daddy on the parody idea, and by the time I finally got his official approval, we were already in the final studio sessions for "Running With Scissors"! It was such a last minute addition to the album that I had no choice but to record all the instrument tracks and background vocals first, just to buy me some time to come up with the lyrics. We were mixing the last few songs on the album by the time I finished writing the lyrics to "Pentiums," and I wound up recording the lead vocals just a couple days before the album had to be mastered. It's a good thing I work well under pressure!"

== Music video ==
The music video is a parody of several rap videos. The video features several "as live" performance scenes. The crowd consists of office workers and features a large WELCOME TO COMDEX sign behind the band. The scene in front of the glass building and the office scenes were shot at the Los Angeles County Department of Public Works Headquarters Building in Alhambra, CA. At the video's beginning, an "old school" car is seen pulling up outside the offices. Initially, the camera is angled at the car's front, yet when it switches to a side view of the car, we see it is ridiculously small. Out of it steps Yankovic, accompanied by four doves. Weird Al used the same car (a Nash Metropolitan) in his earlier production, the movie UHF. As the video is about computers, most of the scenes take place in an office. Yankovic's drummer, Jon "Bermuda" Schwartz, is seen in several of these bits as an office worker yelling "YEAH!" over and over. Emo Philips, who had worked with Yankovic on UHF and The Weird Al Show, is seen as the object of ridicule, sitting in front of a computer in a small orange room and doing things that are mentioned in the song. He waxes his modem, "trying to make it go faster," takes out correction fluid and dabs some on his computer screen, takes an Etch-a-Sketch as if it were the monitor and shakes it to clear it, and proudly shows a picture of Sarah Michelle Gellar from his printer.

During one concert scene, Yankovic can be seen smashing old computer equipment with a sledgehammer, including a monitor and a laptop. John Ranlett (a Bill Gates look-alike) plays a role at the line "I'm down with Bill Gates, I call him 'money' for short". He answers the phone when Yankovic calls him to "make him do [his] tech support," and responds by rolling his eyes. His mug reads "Think similar", a parody of the Apple advertising slogan "Think different". Yankovic and Drew Carey are seen in a fluorescent-lit tunnel. This and the outfits they wear are based on the performances of Mase and Sean Combs (aka. P. Diddy, or Puff Daddy) in the music video for the Notorious B.I.G.'s song, "Mo Money Mo Problems".

== Personnel ==
According to the liner notes of The Essential "Weird Al" Yankovic:

- "Weird Al" Yankovic – lead & background vocals
- Jim West – guitars
- Steve Jay – bass guitar
- Jon "Bermuda" Schwartz – drums, drum programming
- Natasha Barr – female vocals
