= The Saga Begins =

Song by "Weird Al" Yankovic

Single by "Weird Al" Yankovic

from the album Running with Scissors
- A-side: "It's All About the Pentiums"
- Released: June 24, 1999
- Recorded: April 20, 1999
- Genre: Comedy rock, folk rock
- Length: 5:27
- Label: Volcano
- Songwriters: Don McLean, "Weird Al" Yankovic
- Producer: "Weird Al" Yankovic

"Weird Al" Yankovic singles chronology
"The Night Santa Went Crazy" (1996)	"The Saga Begins" (1999)	"It's All About the Pentiums" (1999)

Audio sample
- file; help

Music video
- "The Saga Begins" on YouTube

"The Saga Begins" is a parody song by "Weird Al" Yankovic. It parodies "American Pie" by Don McLean, with lyrics that humorously summarize the plot of the film Star Wars: Episode I – The Phantom Menace through the point of view of Obi-Wan Kenobi, one of the film's protagonists.

The song's title, not mentioned in the lyrics, derives from a tagline that appeared in teaser trailers and the film poster for The Phantom Menace: "Every saga has a beginning". "The Saga Begins" was released as a single from the 1999 album Running with Scissors, and later appearing on the compilation album The Saga Begins.

== History ==
Set to the tune of Don McLean's "American Pie", "The Saga Begins" recounts the plot of Star Wars: Episode I – The Phantom Menace, from Obi-Wan Kenobi's point of view. Yankovic gathered most of the information he needed to write the song from internet spoilers. Lucasfilm declined a request for an advance screening, and Yankovic paid to attend a charity fundraiser pre-screening. He had done such an accurate job with the storyline that he made only minor alterations after the pre-screening.

McLean approved of the song and, according to Yankovic, also has said that his children played it so much that "he'd start thinking about Jedis [sic] and Star Wars, and it would mess him up" in concert. According to Yankovic's website, Lucasfilm's official response to the song was, "You should've seen the smile on George Lucas's face." This is the second Star Wars song Weird Al has created, with the first being 1985's "Yoda", a parody of "Lola" by the Kinks.

== Music video ==
The video begins in the desert on the planet Tatooine. Yankovic, dressed like Obi-Wan Kenobi, the protagonist of Episode I, walks until he comes across Darth Sidious playing the piano. Yankovic uses the Force to get a resonator guitar, and in the second verse he reappears performing in a Mos Eisley cantina leading a band also dressed as Jedi. In the last verse, he returns to the desert; and in the last chorus, numerous "Obi-Wan" clones sing as a group.

- Some Star Wars characters can be seen, such as Queen Padmé Amidala, Qui-Gon Jinn, Mace Windu, and Yoda.
- The upper half of the pianist's face is always covered by the hood of the robe that he is wearing much like the Sith Lord Darth Sidious. When asked why, Yankovic stated that, "They didn't want to scare small children," a reference to the playful teasing of Yankovic's pianist, Rubén Valtierra, commonly used in his live shows.

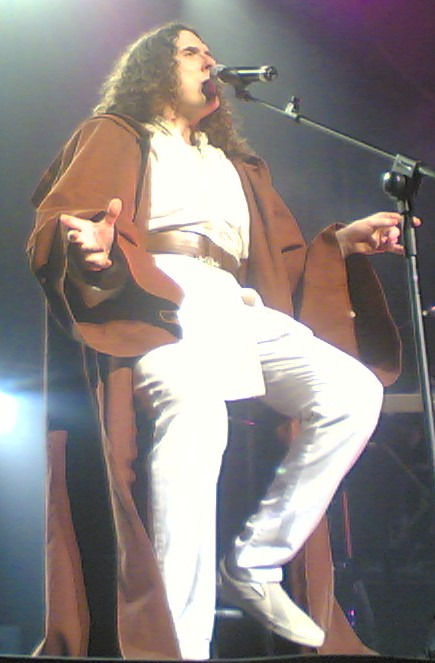
Yankovic performing the song in Auckland, New Zealand on March 10, 2007

In 1999, the music video was included as a bonus feature on Yankovic's first concert DVD, "Weird Al" Yankovic Live! An Easter Egg on the DVD is Yankovic's running commentary on the music video, accessible by pressing the "audio" button twice on the remote control.

In 2011, the entire video was released as a bonus feature in a Star Wars spoofs compilation for the 2011 Blu-ray box set release of the saga.

=== Production ===
The music video was filmed over two days in 1999. Yankovic described the shoot as one of the most difficult of his career. Yankovic wanted to keep it simple, as they could not use scenes from the film, the song was more than five minutes long, and they had a small budget. The concept Yankovic settled on was "MTV Unplugged in the Star Wars Cantina."

Day one was when they filmed the desert scenes. The desert scenes were filmed in the Mojave Desert outside Baker, California. Temperatures reached 120 °F (49 °C) and several crew members passed out from heat exhaustion. Several scenes could only be filmed in one take, as there would be footprints in the sand for a second take. To film the final scene, they did not have time to use a camera dolly, so they got the shot by strapping Yankovic to a crane and spinning him around 50 feet (15 m) in the air.

The second day was when they filmed the cantina scenes. It was a much more comfortable shoot, as it was in an air conditioned studio. It did have its perils, however, as several cast members playing aliens had an allergic reaction to the special effects make-up and developed a rash. Yankovic kept the budget down by casting friends and family members in various roles, such as his second cousin Tammy as Queen Amidala, and a Tower Records clerk he knew as Mace Windu. Yankovic purposely avoided using recognizable Star Wars aliens so as to avoid any copyright troubles with Lucasfilm, but he made an exception for a silhouette of Yoda. He also obtained Lucasfilm's permission to use a promotional photo of Jake Lloyd.

== Live version ==
Al and his band usually perform "The Saga Begins" and Al's earlier Star Wars parody, "Yoda" as an encore. It is usually preceded by a cover of Johann Sebastian Bach's "Toccata and Fugue in D Minor" by Al's keyboardist, Rubén Valtierra. During the 2007-2008 Straight Outta Lynwood Tour, the two were moved to the middle, and Al and his band performed "Albuquerque" as the encore.

When performing the song live in concert, Al is frequently joined by an honor guard of Stormtroopers that he recruits from the local chapter of the 501st Legion. Of working with the 501st Legion, Al says, "Every single one of those Stormtroopers acted like I was doing them the biggest favor in the world by letting them perform on stage with me, when in fact the exact opposite was true."

== Response from Don McLean ==
McLean gave Yankovic permission to release the parody, although he did not make a cameo appearance in its music video, despite popular rumor. McLean himself praised the parody, even admitting to almost singing Yankovic's lyrics during his own live performances because his children played the song so often.

== Radio edit ==
The song was played frequently on Radio Disney and later released on Radio Disney Jams Volume 2. Radio Disney took issue with his line "Did you see him hitting on the queen?" and removed it (so that the song skipped slightly). Yankovic, who usually does not like to change lyrics to suit the needs of others, provided Radio Disney with an updated version, having changed the words to "Did you see him talking to the queen?" He said that the alternate lyrics were preferable to the bad edit.

== Personnel ==
According to the liner notes of The Essential "Weird Al" Yankovic:

- "Weird Al" Yankovic – lead & background vocals
- Jim West – guitars
- Steve Jay – bass guitar
- Jon "Bermuda" Schwartz – drums, tambourine
- Rubén Valtierra – keyboards

== Charts ==
Chart (2010)	Peak position
US Comedy Digital Tracks (Billboard)	20
