= Pretty Fly for a Rabbi =

1999 single by "Weird Al" Yankovic

Single by "Weird Al" Yankovic featuring Tress MacNeille and Mary Kay Bergman

from the album Running with Scissors
- B-side: "Amish Paradise"
- Released: November 22, 1999
- Recorded: April 19, 1999
- Genre: Pop punk; parody
- Length: 3:02
- Label: Volcano
- Songwriters: Dexter Holland, "Weird Al" Yankovic
- Producer: "Weird Al" Yankovic

"Weird Al" Yankovic singles chronology
"Polka Power!" (1999)	"Pretty Fly for a Rabbi" (1999)	"You're Pitiful" (2006)

"Pretty Fly for a Rabbi" (alternatively called "Pretty Fly (For a Rabbi)" in Australia) is a song by "Weird Al" Yankovic. It is a parody of "Pretty Fly (For a White Guy)" by The Offspring, and it was released from the 1999 album Running with Scissors. The song was released as a single exclusively in Australia. Tress MacNeille performs the line "How ya doin' Bernie?", and appears in the music video. Voice actress Mary Kay Bergman also contributes with the "For a rabbi!" line near the middle of the song.

As opposed to the German like nonsense phrase "Gunter Glieben Glauten Globen" (which originated in the hit track Rock Of Ages by Def Leppard) in the original song, Weird Al starts this song with the Yiddish sentence "Veren zol fun dir a blintsa" meaning "You should turn into a blintz." At one point, Yankovic references the line "Mecca lecca hi, mecca hiney hiney ho" and "Mecca-lecca hi mecca lecca chahney ho!", catchphrases of Jambi, the wish-granting disembodied head from Pee-Wee's Playhouse.

== Track listing ==
Australian single

1. "Pretty Fly for a Rabbi" – 3:02
2. "Amish Paradise" – 3:20

== Music video ==
A "music video" for the song was assembled for the single's release in Australia. Yankovic stated that his Australian record company decided to release "Pretty Fly for a Rabbi" as a single and they insisted on releasing a video to go along with it. He decided against the idea, but told them that they could make one themselves by cutting together bits from "Weird Al" Yankovic Live!, which they did.

== Charts ==
Chart performance for "Pretty Fly for a Rabbi"
Chart (1999)	Peak position
Australia (ARIA)	68
