= Disappearance of Christopher Kerze =

1990 disappearance of American teenager

Christopher Kerze
- Born: Christopher Matthew Kerze; February 19, 1973
- Disappeared: April 20, 1990 (aged 17); Eagan, Minnesota, U.S.
- Status: Missing for 36 years, 6 months and 1 day
- Height: 5 ft 11 in (1.80 m)
- Parents: Jim Kerze (father); Loni Kerze (mother)

Christopher Matthew Kerze (February 19, 1973 – disappeared April 20, 1990) is a missing American teenager from Eagan, Minnesota who was last seen on April 20, 1990. His abandoned vehicle was found two days after his disappearance. He is one of the many missing people featured in Soul Asylum's music video for "Runaway Train".

== Disappearance ==
On April 20, 1990, Kerze reportedly stayed home from school indicating that he was sick. The family van was missing when his parents returned home later that day. They found a note from Kerze stating that although something important had come up he would be back by 6 p.m. unless he got lost – which was unusual, as the word "lost" was underlined twice on the note.

The family received a letter from Duluth, Minnesota, on April 21, 1990, saying that Kerze had lied about being sick in order to gain usage of the van and go "to not even I know where." The note further stated that he intended to end his life and apologized for this to his loved ones. Kerze had a O.F. Mossberg & Sons 20-gauge shotgun with him, although he had not taken any ammunition. Authorities have speculated that he may have discarded the gun but they are not certain of that. The van was located abandoned two days later on April 22, 1990, near Grand Rapids, Minnesota.

== Aftermath ==
After his disappearance, posters were distributed and extensive searches were made in an attempt to find Kerze. In 2004, an anonymous letter was received by the Eagan Police Department suggesting they should stop trying to find Kerze and he would return home when he is ready. The police were unable to authenticate the communication, and decided that it had been a hoax.

A week after Christopher's disappearance, his parents began receiving a series of strange phone calls. When they answered the phone there was a lot of noise on the other end, like a party, and when they tried to talk or ask who it was they would hang up. Christopher's neighbor and best friend also began receiving these types of strange phone calls. Mrs. Kerze maintains that it was her son, because they had never had that kind of event before. After six months, those calls stopped abruptly, and no new leads were obtained.

In 1993, the alternative rock band Soul Asylum released the song "Runaway Train". The music video for the song featured information and pictures of missing children with Christopher being featured in the American version.

There was renewed interest in the case in late 2016 after Jacob Wetterling's case was resolved. New age-progressed photos of Kerze were created and missing persons posters were distributed with those photos. The family also gave media interviews regarding the case.

In 2025, Eagan Police Detective Angela Casey, leader of Kerze's missing person investigation, said about the case, "There have been a lot of searches [...] we're committed to our community; it shows the message we don't give up easily."

== See also ==
- List of people who disappeared mysteriously (2000–present)
