= Runaway Train (Soul Asylum song) =

1993 single by Soul Asylum

Single by Soul Asylum

from the album Grave Dancers Union
- Released: May 1993
- Genre: Alternative rock; folk rock; soft rock
- Length: 4:26
- Label: Columbia
- Songwriter: Dave Pirner
- Producer: Michael Beinhorn

Soul Asylum singles chronology
"Black Gold" (1993)	"Runaway Train" (1993)	"Sexual Healing" (1993)

Music video
- "Runaway Train" on YouTube

"Runaway Train" is a song by American alternative rock band Soul Asylum, released in May 1993 by Columbia Records as the third single from their sixth album, Grave Dancers Union (1992). The power ballad became a success around the world, reaching numbers five and four on the US Billboard Hot 100 and Cash Box Top 100, and climbing to the top position on the Canadian RPM 100 Hit Tracks chart. The single earned a gold sales certification from the Recording Industry Association of America (RIAA) after selling 600,000 copies in the US. Outside North America, it reached number two in New Zealand, Norway, Sweden, and Switzerland and peaked within the top five on the charts on several other European countries.

"Runaway Train" helped bring Grave Dancers Union to a multi-platinum level and won a Grammy Award for Best Rock Song in 1994. Its accompanying music video, directed by Tony Kaye, is notable for featuring images of missing people, most of them young children and teenagers. Lead singer Dave Pirner has stated that the lyrics originally described his experience of depression.

== Background and recording ==
"It overshadowed everything else we did, but I'm pleased that the song has a resonance that is not about partying and screwing. It's a sad and reflective song that reminds people that it's not all candy out there, but that they're not alone."

— Dave Pirner talking about the song.

Pirner suffered from a nervous breakdown after he thought he was losing his hearing. He started playing an acoustic guitar, and one of the songs that came out of this was "Runaway Train". Pirner had been fascinated by trains since he was a kid, having watched a "Casey Jones" TV show (likely the local "Lunch with Casey" program that aired in the Twin Cities from 1954-1973). Pirner would use a runaway train as a metaphor for the depression that was spinning out of control.

The first line, "Call you up in the middle of the night" would refer to a friend of Pirner who lived in New York and was kind enough to answer him on the phone, no matter what time it was. After a practice-room tape was presented to various labels in New York, Columbia Records was most interested. The song was then recorded with producer Michael Beinhorn. Pirner told in an interview with The Guardian, "If the vocal on it sounds world-weary, it’s because he made me sing it 100 times." The band's drummer, Grant Young, was replaced during the session by Sterling Campbell. Then keyboards were put on the track in a studio in LA by Booker T from the MGs. "Runaway Train" was released as the third single of the Grave Dancers Union album on June 1, 1993.

== Critical reception ==
"I distinctly recall first hearing 'Runaway Train', not least of all because it was the very first song on the demo cassette they sent me. It just had this rawness to it. It felt like the naked expression of this desperately sad person. Every sentiment, every lyric was so beautifully employed and placed. It all added up to a very intense mood, as well as something that was easy for anyone to relate to who has ever felt lost in their life. It reminded of a classic country-western song in that way."

— Producer Michael Beinhorn talking to Spin about the song.

Larry Flick from Billboard magazine wrote, "Acoustic-anchored midtempo tune has a sweet, string-lined undercurrent that is the perfect embodiment of the song's cinematic, romantic lyrics. Icing on top is a restrained lead vocal and pillowy harmonies. Deserves immediate play." The Daily Vault's Christopher Thelen felt the song was "too sappy and slow". David Howell from Edmonton Journal declared it as "a melancholy song about hopelessness and despair". Dave Sholin from the Gavin Report commented, "Groups like Soul Asylum don't come around very often and neither do songs like this one. For a riveting and chilling experience, go immediately to your VCR and watch the video, which gets my vote as best of the year! A song that truly deserves to become a runaway hit."

In his weekly UK chart commentary, James Masterton said, "This track comes with a powerful video featuring shots of homeless children, putting a whole new slant on what would ordinarily be an ordinary love song. Judging just how well this brand of country-sounding rock will do is difficult. If there is any justice it will go on to be a massive hit." Later he added, "Always a strong track and with 'hit' written all over it". Caren Myers from Melody Maker felt that "Runaway Train" "is quite palatable in a mid-tempo Bruce kinda way". Pan-European magazine Music & Media described it as an alternative guitar-driven pop combo, "temporarily injected with a dash of country." Matt Diehl from Rolling Stone declared it as a "lush country lament", while another editor, Chris Mundy, called it a "beautiful acoustic ballad". Charles Aaron from Spin wrote, "Savoring the band's countryish metal clichés instead of fidgeting against them, Dave Pirner and crew pull off a subtly gripping rock anthem. More generous and less apologetic than anybody could have expected."

== Music video ==
The accompanying music video for "Runaway Train" was directed by English director of films, music videos, advertisements, and documentaries Tony Kaye and received heavy airplay on MTV and VH1 during its duration.

Several versions of the video were made. The video for the United States version begins with a fade to a black screen with a big, white blocked text reading: "There are over one million youth lost on the streets of America", while the UK version begins with "100,000 youth are lost on the streets of Britain". The next scene shows a drawing of an adolescent girl, and a Dave Pirner voice-over saying that the drawing is by a girl who had run away more than 110 times. The scene was often omitted when the video was shown, a common practice when videos had additional footage before or after the song.

After Pirner spoke, the video continued with various shots of the band playing the song, and Pirner singing. Three concrete scenes are shown interspersed among the other images of the video. During the first verse, a child is shown witnessing his grandfather beating and eventually killing his grandmother, before fleeing in fear. During the second verse, a young teenage girl is pimped as a prostitute, and initially purchased by the aforementioned abuser. Later, she is dragged into a van by a gang; afterwards, she is picked up by paramedics and taken to the hospital. During the coda of the song, a small baby is snatched from his stroller by an older woman, with his mother running after the kidnapper's car.

Throughout the music video, various images of children running, or appearing with injuries from abuse, are shown. During the choruses, pictures of missing children would appear on the screen. After each picture was shown, their full name would appear in large capital letters on the screen, along with the year they had been "missing since...".

After the video, in an ending also not regularly shown, Pirner says in front of the camera, "If you've seen one of these kids, or you are one of them, please call this number," with the following screen showing a number one could contact. MTV cut this part out because they did not want to have the video confused with being a public service announcement. VH1 shows the UK version in its full length.

There were three original versions of the video in the United States, totaling 36 missing children shown. The children shown varied with the location of the broadcast, using missing children from that area.

The video received its world premiere on MTV's late-night alternative rock program 120 Minutes on May 16, 1993.

=== Resolved cases ===
According to Kaye, 26 missing children were found after being featured in the video, though a later interview reports that the number was 21. In 2006, guitarist Dan Murphy stated in an interview with Pasadena Weekly that some of the cases featured in the video had ended in tragedy: "Some weren't the best scenarios. I met a fireman on the East Coast whose daughter was in the end of the video, and he'd been in a bitter custody battle with his wife over her", Murphy said. "It turned out the girl hadn't run away, but was killed and buried in her backyard by her mother. Then on tour, another girl told us laughingly 'You ruined my life' because she saw herself on the video at her boyfriend's house and it led her being forced back into a bad home situation."

The UK version of the video featured Vicky Hamilton and Dinah McNicol, who each went missing in 1991. Their remains were found in 2007 at a house in Margate. Peter Tobin has since been convicted of both murders.

Curtis Huntzinger, who was featured in the US video, was located deceased in 2008. His convicted killer, Stephen Daniel Hash, pleaded guilty to manslaughter and, in 2009, was sentenced to 11 years in Folsom State Prison.

Aundria Bowman, also featured in the US video, was a teenage girl who disappeared from Michigan in 1989. In 2020, her adoptive father Dennis Bowman confessed to her murder and burying her remains in the family's back yard, along with confessing to the 1980 rape and murder of Kathleen Doyle in Virginia.

The last image in all three U.S. versions of the video is that of Thomas Dean Gibson, who disappeared from Douglas County, Oregon in 1991 at the age of 2. He is still missing as of May 2025, and age-progressed photos of him at age 18 and age 21 were released in 2009 and 2012, respectively, by the National Center for Missing and Exploited Children. Thomas's father, Larry Gibson, a former deputy sheriff, was convicted of second degree manslaughter after prosecutors alleged that he accidentally killed Thomas when he shot at a stray cat in his front yard even though no remains were ever found. Larry maintains his innocence and claims to have worked on finding Thomas since being released from prison in 1996. The case was explored on an episode of Unsolved Mysteries.

The version shown in Australia showed a number of young backpacking tourists whose families were looking for them. Many of those shown in the Australian version were confirmed victims of serial killer Ivan Milat, who was arrested in 1994 not long after the Australian film clip was released.

Also featured in the video, but still missing as of February 2021 were Christopher M. Kerze, Martha W. Dunn, Andrea D. Durham, Wilda M. Benoit, Byron E. Page, Kimberly S. Doss, Duane E. Fochtman, John F. Lango, Patrick S. Betz and Christina A. Wood.

== Awards ==
Awards for "Runaway Train"
Year	Nominee / work	Category
1994	"Runaway Train"	Grammy Award for Best Rock Song

== Track listing ==
US version #1

No.	Title	Length
1.	"Runaway Train"	4:25
2.	"Black Gold – Live"	3:56
3.	"Never Really Been – Live"	3:12

== Charts ==
=== Weekly charts ===
Chart (1993–1994)	Peak position
Australia (ARIA)	11
Austria (Ö3 Austria Top 40)	3
Belgium (Ultratop 50 Flanders)	8
Canada Top Singles (RPM)	1
Canada Adult Contemporary (RPM)	9
Denmark (IFPI)	4
Europe (Eurochart Hot 100)	5
Europe (European Hit Radio)	10
Finland (Suomen virallinen lista)	11
France (SNEP)	16
Germany (GfK)	4
Iceland (Íslenski Listinn Topp 40)	6
Ireland (IRMA)	6
Israel (Israeli Singles Chart)	7
Lithuania (M-1)	1
Netherlands (Dutch Top 40)	3
Netherlands (Single Top 100)	3
New Zealand (Recorded Music NZ)	2
Norway (VG-lista)	2
Peru (UPI)	4
Sweden (Sverigetopplistan)	2
Switzerland (Schweizer Hitparade)	2
UK Singles (Official Charts)	7
UK Airplay (Music Week)	8
US Billboard Hot 100	5
US Adult Contemporary (Billboard)	15
US Alternative Airplay (Billboard)	13
US Mainstream Rock Airplay (Billboard)	3
US Pop Airplay (Billboard)	2
US Cash Box Top 100	4

Chart (2019–2020)	Peak position
Poland Airplay (ZPAV)	75
Slovenia (SloTop50)	49

=== Year-end charts ===
Chart (1993)	Position
Australia (ARIA)	45
Austria (Ö3 Austria Top 40)	11
Belgium (Ultratop 50 Flanders)	49
Canada Top Singles (RPM)	8
Canada Adult Contemporary (RPM)	61
Europe (Eurochart Hot 100)	20
Europe (European Hit Radio)	23
Germany (Media Control)	18
Iceland (Íslenski Listinn Topp 40)	41
Netherlands (Dutch Top 40)	30
Netherlands (Single Top 100)	29
New Zealand (RIANZ)	23
Sweden (Topplistan)	4
Switzerland (Schweizer Hitparade)	19
UK Singles (OCC)	56
UK Airplay (Music Week)	43
US Billboard Hot 100	22
US Album Rock Tracks (Billboard)	11
US Cash Box Top 100	32

== Certifications ==
Region	Certification	Certified units/sales
Australia (ARIA)	Gold	35,000^{^}
Austria (IFPI Austria)	Gold	25,000^{*}
Canada (Music Canada)	2× Platinum	160,000^{‡}
Germany (BVMI)	Gold	250,000^{^}
New Zealand (RMNZ)	2× Platinum	60,000^{‡}
Sweden (GLF)	Gold	25,000^{^}
United Kingdom (BPI)	Silver	200,000^{‡}
United States (RIAA)	2× Platinum	2,000,000
^{*} Sales figures based on certification alone.^{^} Shipments figures based on certification alone.^{‡} Sales+streaming figures based on certification alone.

== Release history ==
Region	Date	Format(s)	Label(s)	Ref.
United States	May 1993	Radio	Columbia	
United Kingdom	June 1, 1993	12-inch vinyl; CD; cassette	Columbia	
United States	June 1, 1993	CD; cassette	Columbia	
Australia	June 28, 1993	CD; cassette	Columbia	
Japan	March 10, 1994	CD	Sony	

== Cover versions ==
"Runaway Train" was covered by Brent Smith and Zach Myers of American hard rock band Shinedown on their 2014 (Acoustic Sessions) EP and English rockband, Smokie. It was also covered by the British pop band Busted on their 2004 double A-side "Thunderbirds" / "3AM". In 2019, National Center for Missing & Exploited Children invited Jamie N Commons, Skylar Grey and Gallant to cover the song for "Runaway Train 25" campaign. KIDinaKORNER/Interscope donate a portion of the proceeds from domestic digital downloads and streams of the recording to NCMEC for the first year.
