= Grave Dancers Union =

- Cover art by Jan Saudek

Studio album by Soul Asylum
- Released: October 6, 1992
- Recorded: February−May 1992
- Studios: The Power Station and River Sound, New York City; Pachyderm Discs, Cannon Falls, Minnesota; Cherokee Studios, Hollywood
- Genres: Alternative rock; grunge
- Length: 44:42
- Label: Columbia
- Producer: Michael Beinhorn

Soul Asylum chronology
And the Horse They Rode In On (1990)	Grave Dancers Union (1992)	Let Your Dim Light Shine (1995)

Singles from Grave Dancers Union
- 1. "Somebody to Shove" Released: September 1992; 2. "Black Gold" Released: January 1993; 3. "Runaway Train" Released: May 1993

Professional ratings
Review scores
Source	Rating
AllMusic	4/5 stars
Calgary Herald	B
Christgau's Consumer Guide	(1-star Honorable Mention)
Entertainment Weekly	A
The Philadelphia Inquirer	3/4 stars
Q	3/5 stars
Rolling Stone	3.5/5 stars
The Rolling Stone Album Guide	3.5/5 stars
Spin Alternative Record Guide	6/10

Grave Dancers Union is the sixth studio album by American alternative rock band Soul Asylum, released on October 6, 1992, by Columbia Records. The album features the single "Runaway Train", which reached number five on the US Billboard Hot 100 and is the biggest hit of Soul Asylum's career. The album is certified double platinum by the Recording Industry Association of America for sales of two million copies in the United States.

== Overview ==
During recording of Grave Dancers Union, producer Michael Beinhorn grew dissatisfied with drummer Grant Young's performance and brought in Sterling Campbell. He and Campbell would each wind up playing on half the record. Due to the band's reluctance to admit that a session musician was involved in the album's recording, Campbell was credited as "percussionist." Young would continue as the band's drummer for touring duties after the album was released, until he was dismissed and officially replaced by Campbell prior to the recording of their next album, Let Your Dim Light Shine.

The single "Runaway Train", released in June 1993, reached number five on the Billboard Hot 100 and won a Grammy Award for best rock song in 1994. Though the album had sold moderately well to that point, the breakout success of that single was a major factor in the album's eventual multi-platinum sales figures.

The album cover features a photograph by Czech photographer Jan Saudek titled "Fate Descends Towards the River Leading Two Innocent Children", which was taken in 1970.

The album's title comes from the line "I tried to dance at a funeral, New Orleans style, I joined the Grave Dancers Union, I had to file", from the song "Without a Trace".

== Track listing ==
All tracks are written by Dave Pirner.

No.	Title	Length
1.	"Somebody to Shove"	3:15
2.	"Black Gold"	3:57
3.	"Runaway Train"	4:26
4.	"Keep It Up"	3:48
5.	"Homesick"	3:34
6.	"Get On Out"	3:30
7.	"New World"	4:04
8.	"April Fool"	3:45
9.	"Without a Trace"	3:33
10.	"Growing into You"	3:13
11.	"99%"	4:00
12.	"The Sun Maid"	3:50

2008 edition bonus tracks
No.	Title	Length
13.	"Somebody to Shove" (live acoustic)
14.	"Stranger" (live)
15.	"Without a Trace" (live electric)
16.	"Black Gold" (live electric)
17.	"Never Really Been" (live electric)
18.	"Runaway Train" (live electric)

== Personnel ==
Soul Asylum

- Dave Pirner – lead vocals, rhythm guitar
- Dan Murphy – lead guitar, backing vocals
- Karl Mueller – bass
- Grant Young – drums

Additional musicians

- Sterling Campbell – percussion
- Booker T. Jones III – Hammond organ
- Kraig Johnson, Gary Louris – backing vocals
- Meridian String Quartet – strings
- Sonny Kompanek – arranger, conductor

Production

- Michael Beinhorn – arranger, celeste, glockenspiel, producer, horn arrangements
- Chris Shaw - engineer
- Eric Anderson, Bruce Ross – additional engineering
- David Michael Dill, Dan Gellert, Bill Smith – assistant engineers
- Andy Wallace – mixing
- David Leonard – mixing of "The Sun Maid"
- Steve Sisco – mixing assistant
- Wally Traugott – mastering
- Francesca Restrepo – art direction, design
- Jan Saudek – photography

== Charts ==
=== Weekly charts ===
Weekly chart performance for Grave Dancers Union
Chart (1992–1994)	Peak position
Australian Albums (ARIA)	63
Austrian Albums (Ö3 Austria)	2
Dutch Albums (Album Top 100)	30
German Albums (Offizielle Top 100)	8
Hungarian Albums (MAHASZ)	39
New Zealand Albums (RMNZ)	7
Norwegian Albums (VG-lista)	6
Swedish Albums (Sverigetopplistan)	12
Swiss Albums (Schweizer Hitparade)	4
UK Albums (Official Charts)	27
US Billboard 200	11
US Heatseekers Albums (Billboard)	1

=== Year-end charts ===
Year-end chart performance for Grave Dancers Union
Chart (1993)	Position
Austrian Albums (Ö3 Austria)	22
German Albums (Offizielle Top 100)	49
Swiss Albums (Schweizer Hitparade)	27
US Billboard 200	35

=== Singles ===
Chart performance for singles from Grave Dancers Union
Year	Single	Chart	Position
1992	"Somebody to Shove"	Modern Rock Tracks	1
1993	"Black Gold"	Mainstream Rock Tracks	4
1993	"Black Gold"	Modern Rock Tracks	6
1993	"Runaway Train"	Adult Contemporary	15
1993	"Runaway Train"	Mainstream Rock Tracks	3
1993	"Runaway Train"	Modern Rock Tracks	13
1993	"Runaway Train"	The Billboard Hot 100	5
1993	"Runaway Train"	Top 40 Mainstream	2
1993	"Somebody to Shove"	Mainstream Rock Tracks	9
1993	"Without a Trace"	Mainstream Rock Tracks	6
1993	"Without a Trace"	Modern Rock Tracks	27

== Certifications ==
Certifications for Grave Dancers Union
Region	Certification	Certified units/sales
Austria (IFPI Austria)	Gold	25,000^{*}
Canada (Music Canada)	2× Platinum	200,000^{^}
Germany (BVMI)	Gold	250,000^{^}
Switzerland (IFPI Switzerland)	Gold	25,000^{^}
United Kingdom (BPI)	Gold	100,000^{^}
United States (RIAA)	2× Platinum	2,000,000^{^}
^{*} Sales figures based on certification alone.^{^} Shipments figures based on certification alone.
