= Everything You Know Is Wrong (song) =

Song by "Weird Al" Yankovic

from the album Bad Hair Day
- Released: March 12, 1996
- Recorded: November 30, 1994
- Length: 3:47
- Songwriter: "Weird Al" Yankovic
- Producer: "Weird Al" Yankovic

"Everything You Know Is Wrong" is a song by American musician "Weird Al" Yankovic from his ninth studio album, Bad Hair Day (1996). It is a style-parody of American alternative rock band They Might Be Giants.

== Background and composition ==
"Everything You Know Is Wrong" is an original song by "Weird Al" Yankovic from his ninth studio album, Bad Hair Day, released on March 12, 1996. The song was recorded on November 30, 1994, alongside "Callin' in Sick". It serves as a style parody and loving tribute to the American alternative rock band They Might Be Giants (TMBG), a group Yankovic has frequently cited as one of his all-time favorites.

Yankovic consciously sought to emulate TMBG's distinctive musical and lyrical style, stating that he "tried to write a song sort of in their style, but perhaps even a little bit more twisted." The song's composition reflects TMBG's aesthetic, particularly its "Technicolor absurdity and quirkiness" and the "runaway sense of momentum" found in their most infectious songs.

Lyrically, the song embraces the "comedy of Randomness," presenting a series of bizarre and illogical scenarios. These include the narrator driving with a "rabid wolverine in his underwear" and an abduction by aliens resembling Jamie Farr. A recurring morbid theme, often present in Yankovic's 1980s work, is the casual depiction of the narrator's death, such as succumbing to an infected paper cut. The afterlife in the song is equally absurd, with the narrator encountering Saint Peter who, disapproving of his Nehru jacket, assigns him an eternal spot next to a noisy ice machine. The lyrics also feature distinctively "Al" imagery, such as "prosthetic lips" and the "floating disembodied head of Colonel Sanders," satirizing the surreal nature of advertising.

== Plot ==
The song unfolds as a series of increasingly surreal and nonsensical vignettes, each culminating in the titular revelation. In the first verse, Al is driving on the freeway with a "rabid wolverine in his underwear" when a mysterious person in the backseat cups his eyes. After failing to guess the person's identity, they crash into a truck. Lying injured on the asphalt, Al recognizes the person as his "hibachi dealer," who removes his "prosthetic lips" to declare, "Everything you know is wrong." The chorus then asserts that "Black is white, up is down and short is long," and that past important beliefs no longer matter.

The second verse describes Al's accidental step into an "alternate dimension" while heading for Golden Grahams. He is abducted by aliens resembling Jamie Farr, who remove his internal organs, take Polaroids, and, as a thank you, offer to transport him to any point in history. He chooses to return to the previous Thursday night to pay his phone bill. At this point, the "floating disembodied head of Colonel Sanders" appears, reiterating the chorus's message.

In the final verse, Al is about to mail a letter to his "evil twin" when he gets a papercut that becomes infected, leading to his death. He finds himself in heaven with Saint Peter at the pearly gates. Saint Peter disapproves of Al's Nehru jacket, but allows him into heaven, albeit in a room next to a noisy ice machine forever. Each day, Saint Peter runs by, screaming the recurring phrase, "Everything you know is wrong."

== Release and reception ==
"Everything You Know Is Wrong" was released as an album track on Bad Hair Day on March 12, 1996. While not released as a commercial single, the song has been critically well-received for its accurate pastiche and comedic impact. Nathan Rabin of Nathan Rabin's Happy Place lauded the song as "the perfect amalgamation of Al and his inspiration," considering it "one of the most beautifully constructed and just plain perfect songs in Al’s discography." Rabin further described it as "aggressively nonsensical and undeniably anthemic," highlighting its effectiveness in blending Yankovic's unique comedic voice with the stylistic elements of They Might Be Giants.

Members of They Might Be Giants themselves have reacted positively to the homage. John Flansburgh stated in 2011 that he found the song "flattering" and in 2014 called it "fantastically accurate," declaring "Weird Al is the king of his genre." John Linnell commented in 2023 that he "really liked it" and found it "appealed to me as a piece of songwriting" due to its accurate replication of their style, despite initially taking years to listen to it.

== Music video ==
There is no official music video for "Everything You Know Is Wrong," though a fan-made animated video created by Ryan Krzak was uploaded to Newgrounds in August 2007. In 2024, Krzak was commissioned to animate the "Uptown Funk" segment of Yankovic's official "Polkamania!" music video, bringing his style and characters to an official release.

== Personnel ==
- "Weird Al" Yankovic: lead vocals, accordion, keyboards, production
- Jim West: guitar
- Stephen Jay: bass
- Jon "Bermuda" Schwartz: drums, percussion
- Rubén Valtierra: keyboards
- Warren Luening: trumpets
- Gary Herbig: baritone saxophone
- Joel Peskin: clarinet
- Colin Sauers: engineer
