= Clarinet Polka =

Musical composition

"The Clarinet Polka" or "A Hupfata" (Polish "Polka Dziadek", Estonian "Vanaisa polka" – Grandpa Polka) is a popular musical composition from the end of the 19th century. Since 1971 it has been used as an opener in Summer with the Radio (Lato z radiem) − one of the most popular shows of Polskie Radio Program I. The piece, performed (as its name implies) as a polka, has a simple and catchy melody, featuring a prominent extended eight-note arpeggio. It is typically performed in B-flat major.

According to Polskie Radio Program I, the music was created in Austria by a composer named A. Humpfat. Other sources claim that "The Clarinet Polka" was written under the name "Dziadunio Polka" by the Polish composer Karol Namysłowski.
