= Amish Paradise =

1996 single by "Weird Al" Yankovic

Single by "Weird Al" Yankovic

from the album Bad Hair Day
- B-side: "Everything You Know Is Wrong"; "The Night Santa Went Crazy" (extra gory version)
- Released: March 12, 1996
- Recorded: January 15, 1996, in Houston, Texas
- Genre: Comedy hip hop; parody
- Length: 3:20
- Label: Scotti Brothers
- Songwriters: Artis Ivey, Jr.; Larry Sanders; Doug Rasheed; Stevie Wonder; "Weird Al" Yankovic
- Lyricists: "Weird Al" Yankovic; Sherwood Schwartz; George Wyle

"Weird Al" Yankovic singles chronology
"Headline News" (1994)	"Amish Paradise" (1996)	"Gump" (1996)

Music video
- "Amish Paradise" on YouTube

"Amish Paradise" is a song by American musician "Weird Al" Yankovic, released as the lead single from his ninth studio album Bad Hair Day (1996). It is a parody of the hip hop song "Gangsta's Paradise" by Coolio featuring L.V. (which itself is a reworking of the Stevie Wonder song "Pastime Paradise"). In contrast to the original "Gangsta's Paradise", in which the narrator laments his dangerous way of life, the song features an Amish man praising his relatively plain and uncomplicated existence.

== Track listing ==
1. "Amish Paradise" – 3:20
2. "Everything You Know Is Wrong" – 3:46
3. "The Night Santa Went Crazy" (extra gory version) – 3:59
4. "Dare to Be Stupid" (instrumental) – 3:25

== Coolio's response ==
Yankovic sought permission from Coolio before making "Amish Paradise", offering a percentage of the revenues. Yankovic was given rights to use the song by the record company (non-exclusive rights holders) and producer Doug Rasheed, but not by Coolio himself, who declined when presented with Weird Al's offer and subsequently decried the release.

Yankovic later stated on VH1's Behind the Music that he had written a sincere letter of apology to Coolio, which was never returned, and that Coolio never complained when he received his royalty check from proceeds of the song. A series of photos taken at the XM Satellite Radio booth at the 2006 Consumer Electronics Show suggests that Yankovic and Coolio had made amends. In a 2014 interview, Coolio stated that the decision to refuse the parody at the time was "stupid" and he wished that someone on his management had stopped him, and then considered the final parody to be "funny".

During an interview with Sean Evans on Hot Ones in 2016, Coolio further expressed regret for how he initially responded to "Amish Paradise". "In hindsight, it was stupid of me to say something about [Yankovic] doing a parody of 'Gangsta's Paradise'," he said. "I mean, he did Michael Jackson, he did Prince. You know, people who were definitely more talented than I am. I think Prince did say something... but he wasn't very vocal about it like I was. And it just made me look dumb... It was one of the dumb things I did. And I'm willing to admit I did something stupid." While Yankovic never parodied Prince's work due to the latter's express refusal, he has included references to him throughout his own work, including in "Amish Paradise", which featured the phrase "party like it's 1699", homaging Prince's song "1999".

== Music video ==
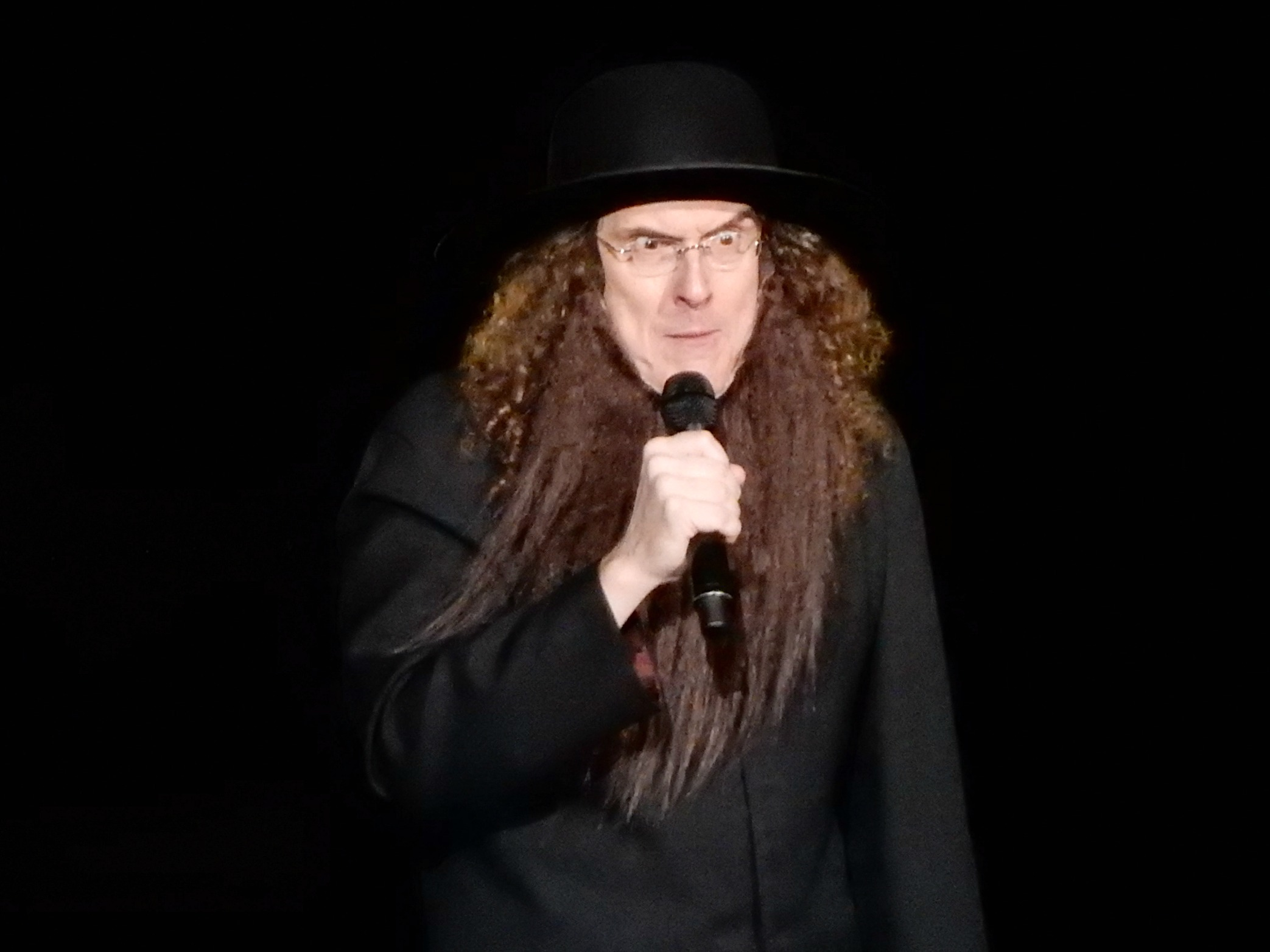
Yankovic performing "Amish Paradise" at Radio City Music Hall in 2016

Yankovic directed the music video for "Amish Paradise" himself, as he has done for many of his music videos since 1986. The music video for "Amish Paradise" closely mirrors the "Gangsta's Paradise" music video and parodies several concepts. Though Yankovic wanted to film in Lancaster, Pennsylvania, where there is a large concentration of Amish, the travel cost to bring everyone needed for filming there was too much, so filming took place in southern California. Many of the extras in the video are Yankovic's own relatives. The video also features Florence Henderson as LouAnne Johnson (as portrayed by Michelle Pfeiffer) from Dangerous Minds in the original video. Yankovic said in 2022 that recording the Buster Keaton gag with the falling house frame was the scariest stunt he had ever done, because it was a steel-reinforced wood frame which, had Yankovic stood in the wrong position, could have injured him fatally.

== Personnel ==
According to the liner notes of The Essential "Weird Al" Yankovic:

- "Weird Al" Yankovic – lead & background vocals, choir vocals
- Steve Jay – bass guitar, synth bass, choir vocals
- Jon "Bermuda" Schwartz – drum programming
- Rubén Valtierra – synthesizers
- Lisa Popeil – choir vocals
- Jim West – choir vocals

== Charts ==
Chart (1996)	Peak position
US Billboard Hot 100	53
US Cash Box Top 100	50

== Rerecording ==
In 2022, for the film Weird: The Al Yankovic Story, Yankovic rerecorded the track, as well as four others. In the film, Yankovic's fictional father reveals that he was raised Amish, and Yankovic finds a lyric sheet written by his father called "Amish Paradise" and decides to perform the song.

== See also ==
- List of singles by "Weird Al" Yankovic
- List of songs by "Weird Al" Yankovic
