= Running with Scissors ("Weird Al" Yankovic album) =

Studio album by "Weird Al" Yankovic
- Released: June 29, 1999
- Recorded: June 29, 1997 – April 20, 1999
- Genres: Comedy; parody; rock
- Length: 49:44
- Labels: Volcano; Way Moby
- Producer: "Weird Al" Yankovic

"Weird Al" Yankovic chronology
Bad Hair Day (1996)	Running with Scissors (1999)	Poodle Hat (2003)

Singles from Running with Scissors
- 1. "The Saga Begins" Released: June 24, 1999; 2. "It's All About the Pentiums" Released: August 4, 1999; 3. "Polka Power!" Released: September 26, 1999; 4. "Pretty Fly for a Rabbi" Released: November 22, 1999

Running with Scissors is the tenth studio album by the American parody musician "Weird Al" Yankovic, released on June 29, 1999. It was the fourth studio album self-produced by Yankovic and his first album for Volcano Records after it acquired Scotti Brothers; it was also the first record to feature his clean-shaven look with longer hair. The musical styles on the album are built around parodies and pastiches of pop and rock music of the late 1990s, largely targeting alternative rock and hip-hop. The album's lead single, "The Saga Begins", however, was a parody of the 1971 single "American Pie" by Don McLean, and it recounts the plot of the film Star Wars: Episode I – The Phantom Menace, which was released around the same time. None of the album's singles charted domestically, although "Pretty Fly for a Rabbi", a parody of "Pretty Fly (For a White Guy)" by the Offspring, charted at number 67 in Australia.

The album featured five parodies. Aside from the aforementioned "The Saga Begins" and "Pretty Fly for a Rabbi", the album also contains lampoons of "One Week" by Barenaked Ladies, "It's All About the Benjamins" by Puff Daddy, and "Zoot Suit Riot" by Cherry Poppin' Daddies. The other half of the album is original material, featuring many "style parodies", or musical imitations of existing artists. These style parodies include imitations of specific artists like Nine Inch Nails and the Rugburns, as well as imitations of different musical genres like zydeco, third-wave ska, and truck-driving country.

Running with Scissors received mostly positive reviews, with critics praising "The Saga Begins"; however, some felt that the album was rushed. The album peaked at number 16 on the Billboard 200. "The Saga Begins" became one of Yankovic's best-known singles, although it never charted on the Billboard Hot 100. Running with Scissors was Yankovic's seventh Gold record in the United States, and was certified Platinum for sales of over one million copies in the US. The album was also certified Gold in both Australia and Canada.

== Production ==
=== Recording ===
In June 1997, Yankovic entered the studio to begin the first of the Running with Scissors sessions, which Yankovic produced himself. Recording with Yankovic were Jon "Bermuda" Schwartz on drums, Steve Jay on bass, and Jim West on guitar. The album was recorded in six sessions. The first session started on June 29, 1997, in which Yankovic recorded the theme song to his television show, The Weird Al Show. The second session, which occurred on October 7, 1998, produced the original song "Germs", and eight days later, on October 15, Yankovic started the third session and recorded three more originals, "Albuquerque", "My Baby's in Love with Eddie Vedder", and "Truck Drivin' Song". The next day, the fourth session resulted in the song "Your Horoscope for Today". On April 19 of the following year, Yankovic recorded four parodies during the fifth session, "Pretty Fly for a Rabbi", "Jerry Springer", "It's All About the Pentiums", and "Grapefruit Diet". The album's sixth and final session occurred on April 20, and resulted in "The Saga Begins", and the album's polka medley, "Polka Power!"

=== Originals ===
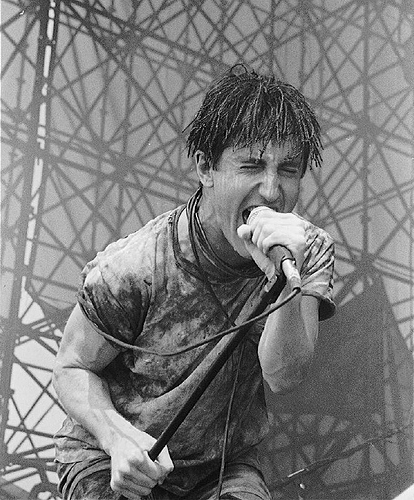
Running with Scissors contains several style parodies, such as "Germs", which is a pastiche of industrial rock band Nine Inch Nails' sound.

The album includes "The Weird Al Show Theme", which is the theme song to Yankovic's short-lived television series. "Germs" is a style parody of industrial rock band Nine Inch Nails that tells of the narrator's germophobia. "Your Horoscope for Today" is a style parody of third wave ska, which features Reel Big Fish members Tavis Werts on trumpet and Dan Regan on trombone, and has lyrics about ridiculous horoscopes. Yankovic attributes the lyrics' inspiration to the satirical newspaper The Onion, and similar comedic horoscopes performed by Gary Owens. After Ophiuchus was touted by some papers as the "13th zodiac sign", Yankovic released new lyrics on his Twitter for the sign. In January 2023 an animated music video was released for the song to promote The Illustrated Al graphic novel.

"Albuquerque", an eleven-minute "hard-driving rock narrative", is a style parody of the Rugburns, particularly the song "Dick's Automotive", and tells the fictional life of Yankovic and his various adventures in the town of Albuquerque, New Mexico. Yankovic originally wrote the song to "annoy people for 12 minutes". He felt that it would be an "odyssey" for fans to successfully sit through it, and so it was placed at the album's end. Instead, to Yankovic's surprise, the song has become a fan favorite. "My Baby's in Love with Eddie Vedder" is a style parody of zydeco about a man's frustration that his girlfriend is obsessed with Eddie Vedder, the lead singer for the grunge band Pearl Jam. "Truck Drivin' Song", a detailed account of a truck driver working while simultaneously worrying about their clothing and makeup, is a style parody of truck-driving country. While writing the song, Yankovic listened to C.W. McCall for inspiration.

=== Parodies and polka ===
The first parody recorded for the album was "Pretty Fly for a Rabbi", a parody of the Offspring's 1998 single "Pretty Fly (For a White Guy)", about a hip rabbi." In order to accurately write the song, Yankovic consulted several of his Jewish friends as well as several English-to-Yiddish dictionaries. The song's opening line – "Veren zol fun dir a blintsa" – is a Yiddish curse that roughly means "May you turn into a blintz." Originally, Yankovic had wanted voice actress Mary Kay Bergman to sing the song as her South Park character Sheila Broflovski. However, due to legal restrictions, she was only able to say a few lines in the finished product. Yankovic then approached actress Fran Drescher, who costarred in UHF with Yankovic, to lend her voice to the song, but this was also unsuccessful. Finally, Yankovic was able to get actress Tress MacNeille – who had been featured in his 1983 parody "Ricky" – to appear in the song.

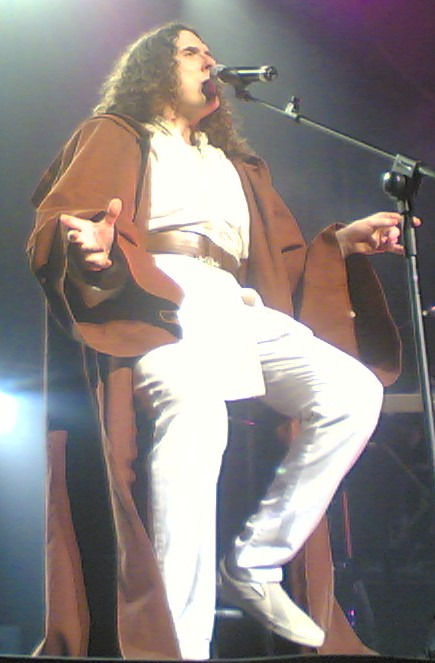
Yankovic performing "The Saga Begins"

The second parody recorded for the album was "Jerry Springer", a parody of Barenaked Ladies 1998 hit "One Week". The song is about The Jerry Springer Show, hosted by the eponymous Jerry Springer. In preparation for the song, Yankovic watched "a couple shows" until he understood the "basic formula" for how the episodes unfolded. Originally, there were plans to shoot a video, and Springer was asked if he wanted to be in it. Springer was initially interested, but after hearing the song, he declined because he believed it was too "negative" towards his show. The third parody recorded for the album was "It's All About the Pentiums", a parody of the rock remix of the track "It's All About the Benjamins" by Sean "Puff Daddy" Combs. Yankovic spoke to Combs personally on the phone to make sure that the parody would not emulate the 1996 Coolio incident. Due to time constraints, Yankovic was forced to write the song a few days before the entire album was slated to be mastered, as Yankovic had still been waiting for Combs' approval. By the time Combs responded to him, Yankovic was recording the last session for the album. To give him time to write the lyrics, Yankovic's band recorded the music first. Yankovic noted that "we were mixing the last few songs on the album by the time I finished writing the lyrics to 'Pentiums', and I wound up recording the lead vocals just a couple days before the album had to be mastered." The fourth parody recorded for the album was "Grapefruit Diet", a pastiche of "Zoot Suit Riot" by the Cherry Poppin' Daddies about an obese man going on such a diet. The song's writer, Steve Perry, called the opportunity to be parodied "an honor" but noted that "Why Weird Al is such an icon is a mystery to me though".

The final parody recorded for the album was "The Saga Begins", which recounts the plot of Star Wars: Episode I – The Phantom Menace from the point of view of Obi-Wan Kenobi to the tune of the 1971 single "American Pie" by Don McLean. Yankovic, who often bases his albums around significant moments in pop culture, felt that the album should have a song centered on the release of The Phantom Menace. Yankovic first considered writing his parody of "Pretty Fly (For a White Guy)" about the film and calling it "Pretty Fly for a Jedi", but he quickly dismissed this idea; he wanted to parody a classic song to commemorate how important the new movie was considered. Yankovic then chose to write a parody of "American Pie" about the film. Because Yankovic wanted the song to be topical, he began writing the lyrics in December 1998, many months before the film was released, gleaning all of the information about the movie's plot entirely from Internet spoilers. The song was completed two months before The Phantom Menace was released to theaters; Yankovic had approached Lucasfilm about the prospect of an advanced screening to ensure that his lyrics were accurate, but the company declined. However, Yankovic later went to a charity screening, whose tickets cost US$500 each. As a result, Yankovic only had to change one line; "He's probably gonna marry her someday" was originally "I hear he's gonna marry her someday". A video which Yankovic later jokingly dubbed "Star Wars Unplugged" was filmed for the song, after The Phantom Menace premiered in theaters.

Much like Yankovic's previous albums, Running with Scissors features a polka medley of then-current hit songs called "Polka Power!". The song was later released as a promotional single in Germany, where Yankovic's recording label felt a polka song might have more success. This was the second time that one of Yankovic's polka medleys was released as a single; in 1985, Scotti Brothers Records released "Hooked on Polkas", from the album Dare to Be Stupid, in Japan.

== Artwork and packaging ==
For nearly 20 years, Yankovic had been known for his hairdo, glasses, and moustache. However, in early 1998, Yankovic grew out his hair, shaved his moustache and underwent LASIK eye surgery to correct his vision, thus making glasses no longer necessary. As such, Running with Scissors was his first album to feature his new look. On the cover, he is shown running on the track at Santa Monica City College, holding a pair of scissors in each hand—a literal depiction of the album's title. The CD booklet contains the complete lyrics to all but one of the album's songs; due to the length of the closing song "Albuquerque", not all of its lyrics fit on the final page of the booklet. Instead of continuing with the "Albuquerque" lyrics, the end of the booklet breaks off mid-sentence and concludes with an apology from Yankovic, in which he states that there was no way he could have fit the rest of the song's lyrics on the existing booklet and that he "should have used a smaller font or a bigger piece of paper or something"; the reproduced lyrics correspond to less than 30 seconds of the song's 11-minute runtime. Yankovic later released the complete lyrics on the "Ask Al" feature on his website, and had them printed in Weird Al: The Book (2012).

Running with Scissors is the first of "Weird Al" Yankovic's albums to feature multimedia content. After placing the CD in a CD-ROM drive, one can browse through the files and play a QuickTime movie file containing fourteen minutes of footage from the Disney Channel concert special "Weird Al" Yankovic: (There's No) Going Home.

== Promotion ==
Following the release of Running with Scissors, Yankovic undertook a two-year-long tour called "Touring with Scissors". Starting on July 19, 1999, Yankovic played over 200 shows across the United States and Canada. A live video recording of one of the shows, called "Weird Al" Yankovic Live! was released later in the year. To promote the album, two promotional websites were launched for the singles "It's All About the Pentiums" and "The Saga Begins": "thepentiums.com" and "sagabegins.com", respectively. Each site featured the respective song's music video, as well as additional information, such as behind-the-scenes notes and lyrics.

== Critical reception ==
Professional ratings
Review scores
Source	Rating
AllMusic	2.5/5 stars
Entertainment Weekly	B
Richmond Times-Dispatch	B+
Pitchfork	7.2/10
Anchorage Daily News	positive
San Antonio Express-News	1.5/5 stars
Rolling Stone	3.5/5 stars

The album received mostly positive reviews from critics. J.D. Considine of Entertainment Weekly gave the album a "B" rating and felt that, while many comedians are unable to translate jokes onto CD, "Yankovic's jokes are eminently listenable." He concluded that "compared with most comedy recordings these days, Running with Scissors is a cut above." Melissa Ruggieri of the Richmond Times-Dispatch graded the album a "B+", writing, "Now on his 10th album, the weird and wacky Al tackles gems such as Don McLean's 'American Pie', The Offspring's 'Pretty Fly (For a White Guy)' and Barenaked Ladies' 'One Week'. Most of the results are priceless." Warren Rhodes of the Anchorage Daily News named the album the fifth best release of 1999, writing that, "Leaving his long-time label [Scotti Brothers] has inspired the parody king; even his originals are pretty good this time." He also wrote that "the intellect's still there, and his wide-ranging chameleon band has no equal." In The Rolling Stone Album Guide, Running with Scissors was given 3.5 stars out of 5, which denoted that the album averaged between good and excellent. The book wrote that Yankovic's "nasal whine has never been put to more appropriate use than [on] 'Pretty Fly for a Rabbi'."

Not all reviews were positive. Steve Huey of AllMusic gave the album two and a half stars out of five and called it "a mixed bag". Huey felt that both "The Saga Begins" and "Jerry Springer" were clever parodies, whereas "Pretty Fly for a Rabbi" and "It's All About the Pentiums" were not "quite up to his usual standards." Robert Johnson of the San Antonio Express-News was critical of the album, giving it one-and-a-half stars, noting that "in his haste to stay up to the minute, [Yankovic] forgot to make ['The Saga Begins'] funny." He wrote that the album "features recycled ideas (fat jokes, alt-rock hits redone as polkas), tunes that sound better than they play ('Pretty Fly for a Rabbi') and weirdness for its own sake (the 11-minute 'Albuquerque')."

== Commercial performance ==
Running with Scissors was released on June 29, 1999. The album entered the Billboard 200 chart at number 35 on July 17, and went up to its peak position of 16 the following week. The album also charted on the Top Internet Albums, a first for Yankovic, entering at number 7, and eventually peaking at number 3. The album was consecutively certified both Gold and Platinum by Recording Industry Association of America (RIAA) for shipments of over 1,000,000 copies in the United States. As of 2014, sales in the United States have exceeded 1,182,000 copies, according to Nielsen SoundScan.

In late 2013, Yankovic sued his label, Volcano, and its parent company Sony for unpaid publishing royalties from several of his albums and singles, including Running with Scissors. Yankovic claimed that—despite the album's success—he never earned royalties from the record. The initial lawsuit was for $5 million; Yankovic won the lawsuit and was awarded an undisclosed sum of money from Sony.

== Track listing ==
No.	Title	Writer(s)	Parody of	Length
1.	"The Saga Begins"	Donald McLean III, Alfred Yankovic	"American Pie" by Don McLean	5:27
2.	"My Baby's in Love with Eddie Vedder"	Yankovic	Original Zydeco song	3:25
3.	"Pretty Fly for a Rabbi"	Bryan Holland, Yankovic	"Pretty Fly (for a White Guy)" by the Offspring	3:02
4.	"The Weird Al Show Theme"	Yankovic	Original; from The Weird Al Show	1:14
5.	"Jerry Springer"	Ed Robertson, Yankovic	"One Week" by Barenaked Ladies	2:46
6.	"Germs"	Yankovic	Style parody of Nine Inch Nails	4:38
7.	"Polka Power!"	Various	A polka medley including: "Wannabe" by the Spice Girls; "Flagpole Sitta" by Harvey Danger; "Ghetto Supastar (That Is What You Are)" by Pras, Ol' Dirty Bastard and Mýa; "Everybody (Backstreet's Back)" by the Backstreet Boys; "Walkin' on the Sun" by Smash Mouth; "Intergalactic" by the Beastie Boys; "Tubthumping" by Chumbawamba; "Ray of Light" by Madonna; "Push" by Matchbox Twenty; "Semi-Charmed Life" by Third Eye Blind; "The Dope Show" by Marilyn Manson; "MMMBop" by Hanson; "Sex and Candy" by Marcy Playground; "Closing Time" by Semisonic; "W.A.Y. Moby Polka" by "Weird Al" Yankovic	4:20
8.	"Your Horoscope for Today"	Yankovic	Style parody of Reel Big Fish and other 1990s third-wave ska	4:00
9.	"It's All About the Pentiums"	Sean Combs, Sean Jacobs, Jason Phillips, David Styles, Christopher Wallace, Kimberly Jones, Deric Angelettie, Yankovic	"It's All About the Benjamins" (Rock Remix) by Puff Daddy	3:34
10.	"Truck Drivin' Song"	Yankovic	Original truck-driving country song	2:27
11.	"Grapefruit Diet"	Stephen Perry, Yankovic	"Zoot Suit Riot" by Cherry Poppin' Daddies	3:30
12.	"Albuquerque"	Yankovic	Style parody of the Rugburns, George Thorogood, and Mojo Nixon	11:22
Total length:				49:44

== Personnel ==
Credits adapted from CD liner notes, except where noted.

Band members

- "Weird Al" Yankovic – lead and background vocals, keyboards, accordion
- Jim West – guitars, banjo, background vocals
- Steve Jay – bass guitar, background vocals
- Jon "Bermuda" Schwartz – drums, percussion, background vocals

Additional musicians

- Rubén Valtierra – keyboards (tracks 1, 4, 5, 11)
- Kim Bullard – keyboards (track 6)
- Warren Luening – trumpet (tracks 4, 7)
- Joel Peskin – clarinet (tracks 3, 7)
- Thomas "Snake" Johnson – tuba (track 7)
- Bill Reichenbach Jr. – trombone (track 4)
- Lee Thornburg^{1} – trumpet, trombone (tracks 8, 11)
- Tavis Werts – trumpet (track 8)
- Dan Regan – trombone (track 8)
- Tom Evans – saxophone (tracks 8, 11)
- Marty Rifkin – pedal steel guitar (track 10)
- Tom Sauber – fiddle (track 2)
- Pat Sauber – banjo (track 10)
- Mary Kay Bergman – female vocal (track 3)
- Tress MacNeille – female vocal (tracks 3, 5)

Technical

- "Weird Al" Yankovic – producer
- Tony Papa – engineer, mixing (tracks 1–3, 5–12)
- Richie Wise – engineer, mixing (track 4)
- Jeff Moses – assistant engineer
- Fredrik Sarhagen – assistant engineer
- Bernie Grundman – mastering
NOTES
- ^{1}Misspelled as "Thornberg" in liner notes.

== Charts and certifications ==
=== Charts ===
Chart performance for Running with Scissors
Chart (1999)	Peak position
Australian Albums (ARIA)	18
Canadian Albums (RPM)	16
US Billboard 200	16

=== Certifications ===
Country	Certification (sales thresholds)
Australia	Gold
Canada	Gold
United States	Platinum

=== Singles ===
Year	Song	Peak positions
Year	Song	AUS
1999	"Pretty Fly for a Rabbi"	67
