= Black Gold (song) =

1993 single by Soul Asylum

Single by Soul Asylum

from the album Grave Dancers Union
- B-side: "The Break"
- Released: January 1993
- Length: 3:57
- Label: Columbia
- Songwriter: Dave Pirner
- Producer: Michael Beinhorn

Soul Asylum singles chronology
"Somebody to Shove" (1992)	"Black Gold" (1993)	"Runaway Train" (1993)

Music video
- "Black Gold" on YouTube

"Black Gold" is a song by Minneapolis rock band Soul Asylum, written by lead singer Dave Pirner. It was released in January 1993, by Columbia Records, as the second single from their sixth studio album, Grave Dancers Union (1992). The song became a top-10 hit on the US Billboard Album Rock Tracks and Modern Rock Tracks charts. The music video for the song was directed by American filmmaker Zack Snyder, who also directed the "Somebody to Shove" video. George Wendt makes an appearance in the video as the gas station attendant pushing the car where Pirner is sitting in.

"The Night Santa Went Crazy" by Weird Al Yankovic has been compared to "Black Gold," though it is not officially a parody and only Yankovic is credited as songwriter.

== Track listing ==
1. "Black Gold" – 3:57
2. "Black Gold" (live) – 3:57
3. "The Break"

== Charts ==
=== Weekly charts ===
Chart (1993–1994)	Peak position
Australia (ARIA)	197
Canada Top Singles (RPM)	58
New Zealand (Recorded Music NZ)	25
UK Singles (Official Charts)	26
UK Airplay (Music Week)	37
US Alternative Airplay (Billboard)	6
US Mainstream Rock (Billboard)	4

=== Year-end charts ===
Chart (1993)	Position
US Album Rock Tracks (Billboard)	18
