= Bubbles in the Wine =

Studio album by Lawrence Welk and His Orchestra
- Released: 1956
- Genre: Easy listening
- Label: Dot

Bubbles in the Wine is an album by Lawrence Welk and His Orchestra. It was released in 1956 on the Dot label (catalog no. CRL-57038).

The album debuted on Billboard magazine's popular albums chart on May 12, 1956, reached the No. 6 spot, and remained on that chart for 17 weeks

== Track listing ==
Side 1

1. "Bubbles In The Wine" (Bob Calame, Frank Loesser, Lawrence Welk)
2. "Ball Of Fire" (vocals by Larry Hooper, written by Larry Gordon, Meg Hense)
3. "It's Almost Tomorrow" (vocals by Alice Lon And The Sparklers, written by G. Adkinson, W. Buff)
4. "Lisbon Antigua" (A. Do Vale, J. Galhardo, Raul Portela)
5. "Flirtation Waltz" (R. Heywood, Leslie Sarony)
6. "The Darktown Strutters' Ball" (vocals by Bob Lido, Aladdin, written by Shelton Brooks)

Side 2

1. "Go 'Way, Go 'Way" (vocals by Bob Lido, written by George Cates, Henry Prichard)
2. "Wake The Town And Tell The People" (vocals by The Sparklers, written by Jerry Livingston, Sammy Gallop)
3. "Oh, Happy Day" (vocals by Larry Hooper, written by Donald Howard Koplow, Nancy Binns Reed)
4. "Moritat" by Lawrence Welk And His Sparkling Sextet (Bert Brecht, Kurt Weill)
5. "Rustic Dance" (C. P. Howell)
6. "The Poor People Of Paris" (Marguerite Monnot)
