= Rubén Valtierra =

American keyboardist (born 1954)

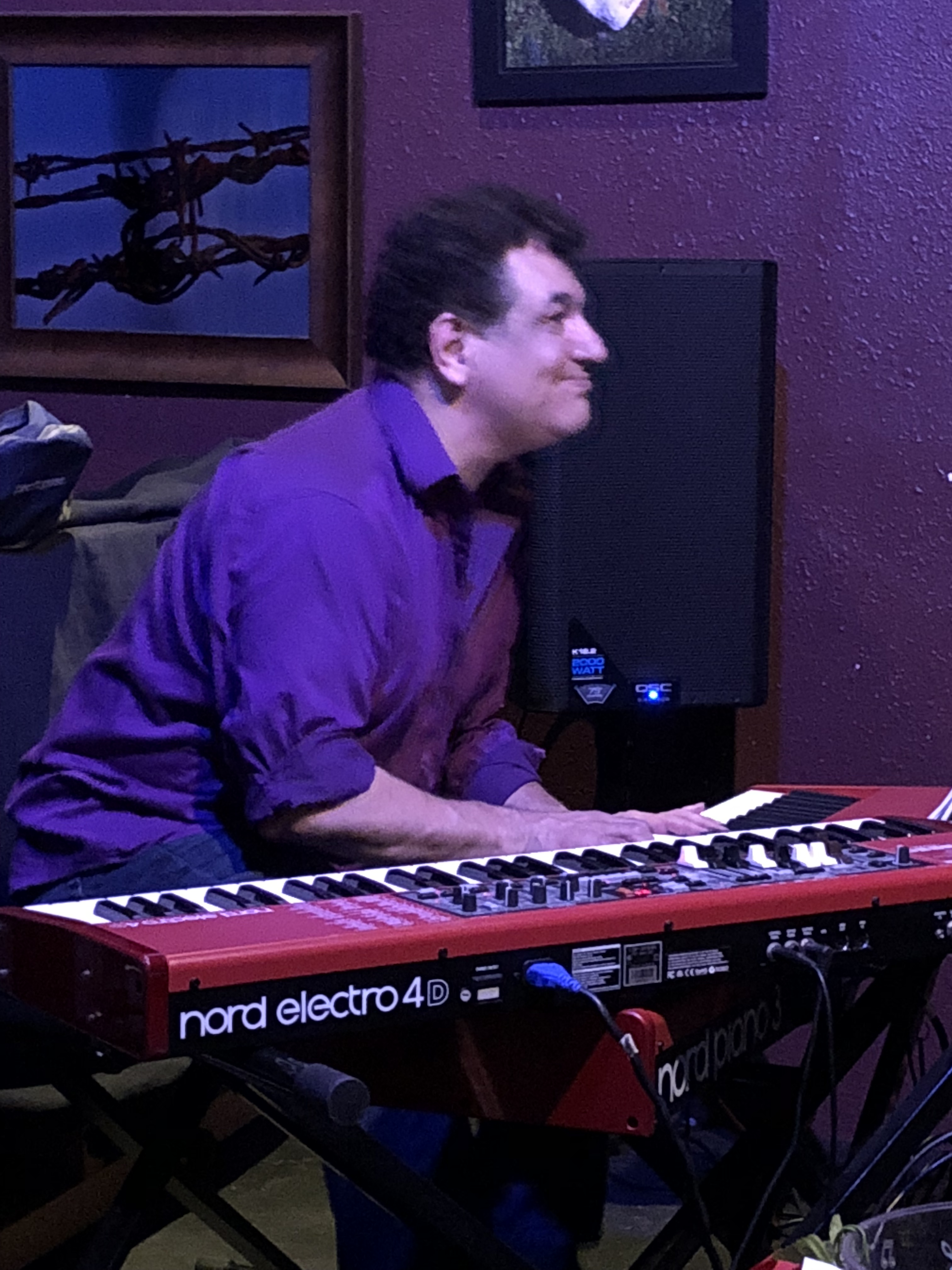
- Born: 26 December 1954 (age 71); San Rafael, California, U.S.
- Occupations: Keyboardist, producer, composer

Rubén Valtierra (born December 26, 1954) is an American keyboardist best known for recording and touring with "Weird Al" Yankovic. The two met at the Dr. Demento 20th Anniversary special in October 1991, and shortly after Valtierra joined his band.

== Biography ==
Valtierra began classical studies at the age of ten. After playing in his high school orchestra, he attended the University of California, Santa Cruz, and later was a member of the award-winning Cabrillo College Big Band. Upon graduation from UCSC in 1978, Valtierra led the popular Santa Cruz jazz/funk fusion group, Rush Hour, until moving to Los Angeles where he began playing and touring with groups such as Santana, Aretha Franklin, Tom Jones, Natalie Cole, Tower of Power, Chick Corea, Elton John, and Red Hot Chili Peppers. Valtierra also toured with Glenn Hughes/Deep Purple in 1995 and Charlie Musselwhite in 1997. Valtierra also writes and produces, and leads his band Valtierra Latin Orchestra (VLO).

== Discography ==
=== With "Weird Al" Yankovic ===
- Off the Deep End
- Alapalooza
- Bad Hair Day
- Running with Scissors
- Poodle Hat
- Straight Outta Lynwood
- Alpocalypse
- Mandatory Fun
