= "Weird Al" Yankovic discography =

List of works by Weird Al Yankovic

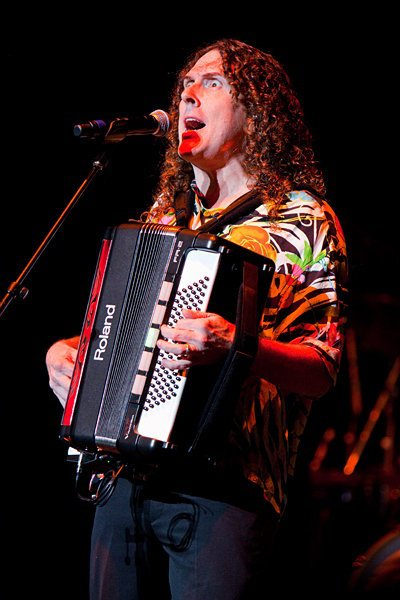
- Yankovic performing during his 2010 tour
- Studio albums: 14
- Extended plays: 2
- Soundtrack albums: 1
- Compilation albums: 9
- Singles: 47
- Video albums: 11
- Music videos: 54
- Other albums: 1
- Box sets: 2

The discography of American musician and parodist "Weird Al" Yankovic consists of fourteen studio albums, two soundtrack albums, nine compilation albums, eleven video albums, two extended plays, two box sets, forty-six singles and fifty-four music videos. Since the debut of his first comedy song in 1976, he has sold more than 12 million albums—more than any other comedy act in history—recorded more than 150 parody and original songs, and performed more than 1,000 live shows. His works have earned him five Grammy Awards among sixteen nominations, along with several gold and platinum record certifications in the United States. Yankovic's first single, "My Bologna", was released in 1979, and he made his chart debut two years later with his second single, "Another One Rides the Bus", which peaked at number four on the Billboard Bubbling Under Hot 100 Singles chart. His self-titled debut studio album was released on Scotti Brothers Records on May 3, 1983, peaking at number 16 on the US Billboard 200 and being certified gold by the Recording Industry Association of America (RIAA). "Ricky", the album's third single, became his first single to chart on the US Billboard Hot 100, peaking at number 64.

"Weird Al" Yankovic in 3-D followed in February 1984. It peaked at number 17 on the Billboard 200 and was certified platinum by the RIAA, while also charting in Australia and Canada. The album's lead single "Eat It" was a commercial success, topping the Australian singles chart and also reaching the top 15 in Canada and the United States. Follow-up singles "King of Suede" and "I Lost on Jeopardy" peaked at numbers 62 and 81 respectively on the Hot 100. Yankovic's third studio album, Dare to Be Stupid, was released in June 1985, peaked at number 17 on the Billboard 200, and produced six singles, the most successful being the Hot 100 hit "Like a Surgeon". Issued in October 1986, his fourth studio album Polka Party! charted at a disappointing number 177 on the Billboard 200, with the album and its accompanying singles failing to match the commercial success of Yankovic's previous work. His fifth studio album, released in April 1988, Even Worse, fared better commercially, peaking at number 27 on the Billboard 200 and earning him a minor chart hit with the single "Fat". Released later in October 1988 was Peter and the Wolf, a collaboration with American composer Wendy Carlos.

In 1989, Yankovic starred in and recorded the soundtrack for the 1989 film UHF. The soundtrack album was released in July 1989, charting at number 146 on the Billboard 200. Released in April 1992, Yankovic's seventh studio album Off the Deep End helped revitalize his career after a decline in commercial success in the late 1980s, peaking at number 17 on the Billboard 200, earning a platinum certification from the RIAA, and producing the Billboard top 40 hit "Smells Like Nirvana". Alapalooza, his eighth studio album, was released in October 1993; it peaked at number 46 on the Billboard 200. Bad Hair Day, Yankovic's ninth studio album was released in April 1996, peaked at numbers 9 and 14 respectively on the Canadian Albums Chart and Billboard 200. "Amish Paradise", the album's lead single, peaked at number 53 on the Billboard Hot 100.

After signing to new label Volcano Records, Yankovic released his tenth studio album Running with Scissors in June 1999. The album peaked at number 16 on the Billboard 200 and produced a minor Australian chart hit, "Pretty Fly for a Rabbi". Poodle Hat, his eleventh studio album, was released in May 2003 and peaked at number 17 on the Billboard 200. Straight Outta Lynwood was released in September 2006 and peaked at number 10 on the Billboard 200, becoming Yankovic's first top ten album on the chart. He also scored his first top ten hit on the Billboard Hot 100 with the album's lead single "White & Nerdy". Alpocalypse was released in June 2011 and peaked at number nine on the Billboard 200, and Mandatory Fun followed in July 2014. The latter became Yankovic's first number-one album on the chart, with first-week sales of 104,000 copies.

Since 1991, when Nielsen started tracking sales, Yankovic has sold 10.3 million albums in United States as of December 2019.

== Albums ==
=== Studio albums ===
List of studio albums, with selected chart positions and certifications
Title	Album details	Peak chart positions									Certifications
Title	Album details	US	US Com.	AUS	BEL (FL)	CAN	SCO	NLD	NZ	UK	Certifications
"Weird Al" Yankovic	Released: May 3, 1983; Label: Rock 'n Roll; Formats: Cassette, LP	139	—	—	—	—	—	—	—	—	RIAA: Gold
"Weird Al" Yankovic in 3-D	Released: February 28, 1984; Label: Rock 'n Roll; Formats: Cassette, LP	17	—	61	—	16	—	—	—	—	RIAA: Platinum; MC: Gold
Dare to Be Stupid	Released: June 18, 1985; Label: Rock 'n Roll; Formats: CD, cassette, LP	50	—	—	—	55	—	—	—	—	RIAA: Platinum
Polka Party!	Released: October 21, 1986; Label: Rock 'n Roll; Formats: CD, cassette, LP	177	—	—	—	—	—	—	—	—	
Even Worse	Released: April 12, 1988; Label: Rock 'n Roll; Formats: CD, cassette, LP	27	—	—	—	23	—	—	44	—	RIAA: Platinum; MC: Gold
UHF – Original Motion Picture Soundtrack and Other Stuff	Released: July 18, 1989; Label: Rock 'n Roll; Formats: CD, cassette, LP	146	—	—	—	—	—	—	—	—	
Off the Deep End	Released: April 14, 1992; Label: Scotti Brothers; Formats: CD, cassette, LP	17	—	45	—	24	—	—	—	—	RIAA: Platinum; MC: Platinum
Alapalooza	Released: October 5, 1993; Label: Scotti Brothers; Formats: CD, cassette	46	—	—	—	27	—	—	—	—	RIAA: Gold; MC: 2× Platinum
Bad Hair Day	Released: March 12, 1996; Label: Scotti Brothers; Formats: CD, cassette	14	—	—	—	9	—	—	—	—	RIAA: 2× Platinum; MC: Platinum
Running with Scissors	Released: June 29, 1999; Label: Volcano; Formats: CD, cassette, digital download	16	—	18	—	16	—	—	—	—	RIAA: Platinum; ARIA: Gold; MC: Gold
Poodle Hat	Released: May 20, 2003; Label: Volcano; Formats: CD, cassette, digital download	17	12	26	—	—	—	—	—	—	
Straight Outta Lynwood	Released: September 26, 2006; Label: Volcano; Formats: CD, cassette, digital download	10	1	27	—	26	—	—	—	—	RIAA: Gold
Alpocalypse	Released: June 21, 2011; Label: Volcano; Formats: CD, LP, digital download	9	1	28	—	13	—	—	—	—	
Mandatory Fun	Released: July 15, 2014; Label: RCA; Formats: CD, LP, digital download	1	1	9	198	3	85	99	16	71	
"—" denotes a recording that did not chart or was not released in that territory.

==== Collaborative albums ====
List of collaborative studio albums
Title	Album details	US Classical Crossover
Peter & the Wolf (with Wendy Carlos)	Released: October 4, 1988; Label: CBS; Formats: CD, cassette, LP	8

=== Soundtrack albums ===
Title	Album details
Weird: The Al Yankovic Story	Released: November 4, 2022; Label: Ear Booker Music, Roku, Inc., Sony Music; Formats: Streaming, CD, LP

=== Compilation albums ===
List of compilation albums, with selected chart positions and certifications
Title	Album details	Peak chart positions			Certifications
Title	Album details	US	US Com.	AUS	Certifications
Eat It	Released: 1984 (Japan); Label: Scotti Brothers, Canyon; Formats: CD, cassette, LP	—	—	—	
The Official Music of "Weird Al" Yankovic: Al Hits Tokyo	Released: 1984 (Japan); Label: Scotti Brothers, Canyon; Formats: Cassette, LP	—	—	—	
"Weird Al" Yankovic's Greatest Hits	Released: October 1988; Label: Rock 'n Roll; Formats: CD, cassette, LP	—	—	—	
The Best of Yankovic	Released: 1992 (South Korea); Label: Scotti Brothers; Formats: LP	—	—	—	
The Food Album	Released: June 22, 1993; Label: Scotti Brothers; Formats: CD, cassette	—	—	—	RIAA: Gold
Greatest Hits Volume II	Released: October 25, 1994; Label: Scotti Brothers; Formats: CD, cassette	198	—	—	
The TV Album	Released: November 7, 1995; Label: Scotti Brothers; Formats: CD, cassette	—	—	—	
The Saga Begins	Released: January 25, 2000 (Japan only); Label: Avex; Formats: CD	—	—	—	
The Essential "Weird Al" Yankovic	Released: October 27, 2009; Label: Volcano; Formats: CD, digital download	178	1	45	
"—" denotes a recording that did not chart or was not released in that territory.

=== Video releases ===
List of video releases, with selected chart positions and certifications
Title	Album details	Peak chart positions	Certifications
Title	Album details	US Video	Certifications
Eat It	Released: 1984; Label: Scotti Brothers, Pony Video; Formats: VHS	—	
The "Weird Al" Yankovic Video Library	Released: May 22, 1992; Label: Scotti Brothers; Formats: VHS	—	RIAA: Gold
"Weird Al" Yankovic: The Ultimate Collection	Released: 1993; Label: Scotti Brothers; Formats: VHS	—	
Alapalooza: The Videos	Released: February 2, 1994; Label: Scotti Brothers; Formats: VHS	4	RIAA: Gold
Bad Hair Day: The Videos	Released: June 4, 1996; Label: Scotti Brothers; Formats: VHS	1	RIAA: Gold
"Weird Al" Yankovic: The Videos	Released: January 21, 1998; Label: Image Entertainment; Formats: DVD, LD	—	
"Weird Al" Yankovic Live!	Released: November 23, 1999; Label: Volcano; Formats: DVD	—	RIAA: Gold
"Weird Al" Yankovic: The Ultimate Video Collection	Released: November 4, 2003; Label: Volcano; Formats: DVD	22	RIAA: Platinum
Video Triple Play	Released: 2007; Label: Zomba; Formats: Digital download	—	
"Weird Al" Yankovic Live! – The Alpocalypse Tour	Released: October 4, 2011; Label: Volcano; Formats: DVD, BD	—	
Alpocalypse HD	Released: November 8, 2011; Label: Volcano; Formats: BD	—	
"—" denotes a recording that did not chart or was not released in that territory.

== Box sets ==
List of box sets, with selected chart positions and certifications
Title	Album details	Peak chart positions	
Title	Album details	US	US Com.
Permanent Record: Al in the Box	Released: September 27, 1994; Label: Scotti Brothers; Formats: CD, Cassette	—	—
Squeeze Box	Released: November 24, 2017; Label: Legacy Recordings; Formats: Vinyl, CD	185	1
"—" denotes a recording that did not chart or was not released in that territory.

== Extended plays ==
List of extended plays, with selected chart positions
Title	Details	Peak chart positions
Title	Details	US Com.
Another One Rides the Bus	Released: February 1981; Label: Placebo; Formats: 7"	—
Internet Leaks	Released: August 25, 2009; Label: Volcano; Formats: Digital download	8
"—" denotes a recording that did not chart or was not released in that territory.

== Singles ==
List of singles, with selected chart positions and certifications, showing year released and album name
Title	Year	Peak chart positions						Certifications	Album
Title	Year	US	AUS	CAN	NZ	SWE	UK	Certifications	Album
"My Bologna"	1979	—	—	—	—	—	—		Non-album single (Note: A re-recorded version of this song would appear on Yankovic's self-titled debut album)
"Another One Rides the Bus"	1981	— (Note: "Another One Rides the Bus" did not enter the Billboard Hot 100, but peaked at number four on the Bubbling Under Hot 100 Singles chart, which acts as an extension to the Hot 100.)	—	—	—	—	—		"Weird Al" Yankovic
"Ricky"	1983	63	—	—	—	—	—		"Weird Al" Yankovic
"I Love Rocky Road"	1983	— (Note: "I Love Rocky Road" did not enter the Billboard Hot 100, but peaked at number six on the Bubbling Under Hot 100 Singles chart, which acts as an extension to the Hot 100.)	—	—	—	—	—		"Weird Al" Yankovic
"Eat It"	1984	12	1	5	6	—	36	RIAA: Gold; MC: Gold	"Weird Al" Yankovic in 3-D
"King of Suede"	1984	62	—	—	—	—	—		"Weird Al" Yankovic in 3-D
"I Lost on Jeopardy"	1984	81	—	—	—	—	—		"Weird Al" Yankovic in 3-D
"This Is the Life"	1984	—	—	—	—	—	—		Dare to Be Stupid
"Like a Surgeon"	1985	47	19	35	—	—	—		Dare to Be Stupid
"I Want a New Duck"	1985	—	—	—	—	—	—		Dare to Be Stupid
"One More Minute"	1985	—	—	—	—	—	—		Dare to Be Stupid
"Hooked on Polkas"	1985	—	—	—	—	—	—		Dare to Be Stupid
"Dare to Be Stupid"	1986	—	—	—	—	—	—		Dare to Be Stupid
"Living with a Hernia"	1986	—	—	—	—	—	—		Polka Party!
"Christmas at Ground Zero"	1986	—	—	—	—	—	—		Polka Party!
"Fat"	1988	99	12	73	3	—	80		Even Worse
"Lasagna"	1988	—	—	—	—	—	—		Even Worse
"I Think I'm a Clone Now"	1988	—	—	—	—	—	—		Even Worse
"UHF"	1989	—	—	—	—	—	—		UHF – Original Motion Picture Soundtrack and Other Stuff
"Money for Nothing/Beverly Hillbillies*"	1989	—	—	—	—	—	—		UHF – Original Motion Picture Soundtrack and Other Stuff
"Isle Thing" (promo)	1989	—	—	—	—	—	—		UHF – Original Motion Picture Soundtrack and Other Stuff
"Smells Like Nirvana"	1992	35	24	48	4	38	58	ARIA: Gold	Off the Deep End
"You Don't Love Me Anymore"	1992	—	—	26	—	—	—		Off the Deep End
"Taco Grande" (promo)	1992	—	—	—	—	—	—		Off the Deep End
"Jurassic Park"	1993	—	84	5	—	—	—		Alapalooza
"Bedrock Anthem"	1993	—	—	—	36	—	—		Alapalooza
"Achy Breaky Song" (promo)	1993	—	—	—	—	—	—		Alapalooza
"Headline News"	1994	— (Note: "Headline News" did not enter the Billboard Hot 100, but peaked at number four on the Bubbling Under Hot 100 Singles chart, which acts as an extension to the Hot 100.)	—	—	—	—	—		Permanent Record: Al in the Box
"Amish Paradise"	1996	53	—	—	—	—	—		Bad Hair Day
"Gump"	1996	— (Note: "Gump" did not enter the Billboard Hot 100, but peaked at number two on the Bubbling Under Hot 100 Singles chart, which acts as an extension to the Hot 100.)	—	—	—	—	—		Bad Hair Day
"Spy Hard"	1996	—	—	—	—	—	—		Non-album single
"The Night Santa Went Crazy"	1996	—	—	—	—	—	—		Bad Hair Day
"The Saga Begins"	1999	—	—	—	—	—	—		Running with Scissors
"It's All About the Pentiums"	1999	—	—	—	—	—	—		Running with Scissors
"Polka Power!"	1999	—	—	—	—	—	—		Running with Scissors
"Pretty Fly for a Rabbi"	1999	—	68	—	—	—	—		Running with Scissors
"Don't Download This Song"	2006	—	—	—	—	—	—		Straight Outta Lynwood
"White & Nerdy"	2006	9	—	— (Note: "White & Nerdy" did not enter the Billboard Canadian Hot 100, but peaked at number 9 on the Canadian Digital Song Sales chart.)	—	14	80	RIAA: Platinum	Straight Outta Lynwood
"Canadian Idiot"	2006	82	—	—	—	—	—		Straight Outta Lynwood
"Whatever You Like"	2008	— (Note: "Whatever You Like" did not enter the Billboard Hot 100, but peaked at number four on the Bubbling Under Hot 100 Singles chart, which acts as an extension to the Hot 100.)	—	—	—	—	—		Alpocalypse
"Craigslist"	2009	—	—	—	—	—	—		Alpocalypse
"Skipper Dan"	2009	—	—	—	—	—	—		Alpocalypse
"CNR"	2009	—	—	—	—	—	—		Alpocalypse
"Ringtone"	2009	—	—	—	—	—	—		Alpocalypse
"Perform This Way"	2011	—	—	—	—	—	—		Alpocalypse
"The Hamilton Polka"	2018	—	—	—	—	—	—		Non-album single
"Now You Know"	2022	—	—	—	—	—	—		Weird: The Al Yankovic Story
"Polkamania!"	2024	—	—	—	—	—	—		Non-album single
"—" denotes a recording that did not chart or was not released in that territory.

== Other charted songs ==
The following songs charted in the US, despite not having been released as official singles:

List of songs, with selected chart positions, showing year released and album name
Title	Year	Peak chart positions	Album
Title	Year	US	Album
"eBay"	2003	— (Note: "eBay" did not enter the Billboard Hot 100, but peaked at number 15 on the Bubbling Under Hot 100 Singles chart, which acts as an extension to the Hot 100.)	Poodle Hat
"Word Crimes"	2014	39	Mandatory Fun
"—" denotes a recording that did not chart or was not released in that territory.

== Guest appearances ==
List of guest appearances, with other performing artists, showing year released and album name
Title	Year	Other artist(s)	Album
"Take Me Down"	1978	none	Slo Grown
"I Guess That's Why They Call It the Zoo"	1985	Z100 Morning Zoo staff (Scott Shannon, et al.)	The Z100 Morning Zoo – Greatest Hits (Volume 1)
"Who Stole the Kishka?"	1996	Frankie Yankovic	Songs of the Polka King, Vol. 1
"Polkamon"	2000	none	Pokémon: The Movie 2000 soundtrack
"I Need a Nap"	2005	Kate Winslet	Dog Train
"True Player for Real"	2009	MC Lars, Wheatus	This Gigantic Robot Kills
"Street Meat (You Keep Tauntin' Me)"	2010	Mike Phirman	The Very Last Songs I Will Ever Record (Part One)
"Circus Parade"	2011	none	Music Is...Awesome! Volume 3
"Track 5 (And a Bit)"	2012	Chris Moyles, Ricky Wilson	The Difficult Second Album
"Daisy Bell"	2014	none	The Gay Nineties: Olde Tyme Music
"What Is Life"	2014	Brian Wilson, Ann Wilson, Norah Jones, et al.	George Fest: A Night to Celebrate the Music of George Harrison
"Who's Gonna Stop Me"	2020	Portugal. The Man	none
"Word Search/Vacuum"	2021	Mike Phirman	Activity Books
"Yo Me Estreso"	2024	The Linda Lindas	No Obligation
"New Year's Eve Polka (5-4-3-2-1)"	2024	Jimmy Fallon and the Roots	Holiday Seasoning

== Music videos ==
List of music videos, showing year released and directors
Title	Year	Director(s)
"Ricky"	1983	Janet Greek
"I Love Rocky Road"	1983	Dror Soref
"Eat It"	1983	Jay Levey
"I Lost on Jeopardy"	1983	Francis Delia
"This Is the Life"	1984	Jay Levey, Robert K. Weiss
"Like a Surgeon"	1985	Jay Levey, Robert K. Weiss
"Dare to Be Stupid"	1985	Jay Levey, Robert K. Weiss
"One More Minute"	1985	Jay Levey, Robert K. Weiss
"Living with a Hernia"	1986	Jay Levey
"Christmas at Ground Zero"	1986	Al Yankovic
"Fat"	1988	Jay Levey
"Money for Nothing/Beverly Hillbillies*"	1989	Jay Levey
"UHF"	1989	Jay Levey
"Smells Like Nirvana"	1992	Jay Levey
"You Don't Love Me Anymore"	1992	Jay Levey
"Jurassic Park"	1993	Mark Osborne, Scott Nordlund
"Bedrock Anthem"	1993	Al Yankovic
"Headline News"	1994	Al Yankovic
"Amish Paradise"	1996	Al Yankovic
"Gump"	1996	Al Yankovic
"Spy Hard"	1996	Al Yankovic
"The Saga Begins"	1999	Al Yankovic
"It's All About the Pentiums"	1999	Al Yankovic
"Bob"	2003	Al Yankovic
"Don't Download This Song"	2006	Bill Plympton
"I'll Sue Ya"	2006	Thomas Lee
"Virus Alert"	2006	David C. Lovelace
"Close but No Cigar"	2006	John Kricfalusi
"Pancreas"	2006	Jim Blashfield
"Weasel Stomping Day"	2006	Robot Chicken
"White & Nerdy"	2006	Al Yankovic
"Do I Creep You Out"	2006	Evan Spiridellis
"Trapped in the Drive-Thru"	2007	Doug Bresler
"Craigslist"	2009	Liam Lynch
"Skipper Dan"	2009	Divya Srinivasan
"CNR"	2009	Gregg Spiridellis, Evan Spiridellis
"Ringtone"	2009	Josh Faure-Brac, Dustin McLean
"TMZ"	2011	Bill Plympton
"Party in the CIA"	2011	Roque Ballestros
"Another Tattoo"	2011	Augenblick Studios
"If That Isn't Love"	2011	Brian Frisk
"Whatever You Like"	2011	Cris Shapan
"Stop Forwarding That Crap to Me"	2011	Koos Dekker
"Perform This Way"	2011	Al Yankovic
"Polka Face"	2011	Melanie Mandl, et al.
"Daisy Bell"	2014	Mark Ryden
"Tacky"	2014	Al Yankovic
"Word Crimes"	2014	Jarrett Heather
"Foil"	2014	Al Yankovic
"Handy"	2014	Al Yankovic
"Sports Song"	2014	Al Yankovic, Andrew Bush
"First World Problems"	2014	Liam Lynch
"Lame Claim to Fame"	2014	Tim Thompson
"Mission Statement"	2014	TruScribe
"Now You Know"	2022	TruScribe
"Your Horoscope for Today"	2023	Josh Pilch
"Polkamania"	2024	Melanie Mandl, et al.

== See also ==
- List of songs by "Weird Al" Yankovic
