= Squeeze Box: The Complete Works of "Weird Al" Yankovic =

Compilation box set by "Weird Al" Yankovic

Box set by "Weird Al" Yankovic
- Released: November 24, 2017
- Genres: Comedy rock; comedy pop; comedy hip hop; parody; polka
- Label: Legacy Recordings
- Producers: "Weird Al" Yankovic, Rick Derringer

"Weird Al" Yankovic chronology
Mandatory Fun (2014)	Squeeze Box (2017)	Weird: The Al Yankovic Story (2022)

Squeeze Box: The Complete Works of "Weird Al" Yankovic is a 15-album box set by the American parody musician "Weird Al" Yankovic, released on November 24, 2017. Squeeze Box marks Yankovic's second box set since 1994's Permanent Record: Al in the Box.

== Packaging ==
The set is housed inside a replica of Yankovic's accordion. This "unprecedented" style of packaging caused the entire set to have a rather long lead manufacturing time. Squeeze Box also comes with "a 100-page book including a treasure trove of unseen photos and memorabilia."

== Release ==
A pre-order for the set was released on January 12, 2017, via Pledge Music, almost ten months ahead of its release. This was due to the time it would take for the manufacturer to create the packaging. The box was available in both vinyl and CD formats. The CD version featured the discs themselves housed in custom-fitted pockets in sleeves with standard LP-size jackets. The LP version marked the first time that five of Yankovic's albums (Alapalooza, Bad Hair Day, Running with Scissors, Poodle Hat, and Straight Outta Lynwood) appeared on vinyl. Following the Pledge Music pre-order, only a handful of the sets were manufactured and released.

== Contents ==
Squeeze Box collects all of Yankovic's 14 studio albums, ranging from his 1983 debut "Weird Al" Yankovic, to his 2014 studio release Mandatory Fun. Six of these records ("Weird Al" Yankovic, "Weird Al" Yankovic in 3-D, Dare to Be Stupid, Polka Party!, Even Worse, UHF – Original Motion Picture Soundtrack and Other Stuff) were produced by Rick Derringer. The remaining albums (Off the Deep End, Alapalooza, Bad Hair Day, Running with Scissors, Poodle Hat, Straight Outta Lynwood, Alpocalypse, and Mandatory Fun) were produced by Yankovic himself. "Weird Al" Yankovic through Bad Hair Day had been released by the now-defunct Scotti Bros. Records, Running with Scissors through Alpocalypse were released by Volcano Entertainment, and Mandatory Fun was released by RCA Records. All three labels are now under the control of Sony Music Entertainment, whose Legacy Recordings unit released the compilation. The songs that are featured in this collection have all been remastered. The fifteenth record, Medium Rarities, is a bonus album composed of new and unreleased content.

=== "Weird Al" Yankovic (1983) ===
Side one
No.	Title	Writer(s)	Parody of	Length
1.	"Ricky"	Mike Chapman, Nicky Chinn, "Weird Al" Yankovic	"Mickey" by Toni Basil	2:36
2.	"Gotta Boogie"	Yankovic	Original	2:14
3.	"I Love Rocky Road"	Alan Merrill, Jake Hooker, Yankovic	"I Love Rock 'n' Roll" by Joan Jett & the Blackhearts	2:36
4.	"Buckingham Blues"	Yankovic	Original	3:13
5.	"Happy Birthday"	Yankovic	Style parody of Tonio K	2:28
6.	"Stop Draggin' My Car Around"	Tom Petty, Mike Campbell, Yankovic	"Stop Draggin' My Heart Around" by Stevie Nicks & Tom Petty and the Heartbreakers	3:16

Side two
No.	Title	Writer(s)	Parody of	Length
7.	"My Bologna"	Doug Fieger, Berton Averre, Yankovic	"My Sharona" by the Knack	2:01
8.	"The Check's in the Mail"	Yankovic	Original	3:13
9.	"Another One Rides the Bus"	John Deacon, Yankovic (Note: While Yankovic wrote new lyrics for the song, on February 2, 1981, he transferred copyright of the parody to John Deacon. This is reflected in the liner notes for the album itself, which lists only Deacon as the parody's writer.)	"Another One Bites the Dust" by Queen	2:40
10.	"I'll Be Mellow When I'm Dead"	Yankovic	Original	3:39
11.	"Such a Groovy Guy"	Yankovic	Original	3:02
12.	"Mr. Frump in the Iron Lung"	Yankovic	Original	1:54
Total length:				32:59

=== "Weird Al" Yankovic in 3-D (1984) ===
Side one
No.	Title	Writer(s)	Parody of	Length
1.	"Eat It"	Michael Jackson, Alfred Yankovic	"Beat It" by Michael Jackson	3:21
2.	"Midnight Star"	Yankovic	Original	4:35
3.	"The Brady Bunch"	Ivan Doroschuk, Sherwood Schwartz, Frank De Vol, Yankovic	"The Safety Dance" by Men Without Hats	2:37
4.	"Buy Me a Condo"	Yankovic	Style parody of Bob Marley and reggae, specifically "Buffalo Soldier"	3:45
5.	"I Lost on Jeopardy"	Gregory Kihn, Steve Wright, Yankovic	"Jeopardy" by the Greg Kihn Band	3:28
6.	"Polkas on 45"	Various	A polka medley including: "Jocko Homo" by Devo; "Smoke on the Water" by Deep Purple; "Sex (I'm a ...)" by Berlin; "Hey Jude" by the Beatles; "L.A. Woman" by the Doors; "In-A-Gadda-Da-Vida" by Iron Butterfly; "Hey Joe" by the Jimi Hendrix Experience; "Burning Down the House" by Talking Heads; "Hot Blooded" by Foreigner; "Bubbles in the Wine" by Lawrence Welk; "Every Breath You Take" by the Police; "Should I Stay or Should I Go" by the Clash; "Jumpin' Jack Flash" by the Rolling Stones; "My Generation" by the Who; "Ear Booker Polka" by "Weird Al" Yankovic	4:23

Side two
No.	Title	Writer(s)	Parody of	Length
7.	"Mr. Popeil"	Yankovic	Style parody of the B-52s	4:42
8.	"King of Suede"	Gordon Sumner, Yankovic	"King of Pain" by the Police	4:13
9.	"That Boy Could Dance"	Yankovic	Original	3:34
10.	"Theme from Rocky XIII"	Frank Sullivan, James Peterik, Yankovic	"Eye of the Tiger" by Survivor	3:37
11.	"Nature Trail to Hell"	Yankovic	Original	5:55
Total length:				44:03

=== Dare to Be Stupid (1985) ===
Side one
No.	Title	Writer(s)	Parody of	Length
1.	"Like a Surgeon"	William Steinberg, Thomas Kelly, Alfred Yankovic	"Like a Virgin" by Madonna	3:32
2.	"Dare to Be Stupid"	Yankovic	Style parody of Devo	3:25
3.	"I Want a New Duck"	Christopher Hayes, Hugh Cregg III, Yankovic	"I Want a New Drug" by Huey Lewis and the News	3:04
4.	"One More Minute"	Yankovic	Style parody of Elvis Presley-like doo-wop	4:04
5.	"Yoda"	Raymond Davies, Yankovic	"Lola" by the Kinks	3:58

Side two
No.	Title	Writer(s)	Parody of	Length
6.	"George of the Jungle"	Stan Worth, Sheldon Allman	Cover of the George of the Jungle theme song	1:05
7.	"Slime Creatures from Outer Space"	Yankovic	Style parody of 1950s sci-fi soundtracks and "Hyperactive!" by Thomas Dolby	4:23
8.	"Girls Just Want to Have Lunch"	Robert Hazard, Yankovic	"Girls Just Want to Have Fun" by Cyndi Lauper	2:48
9.	"This Is the Life"	Yankovic	Theme song of the film Johnny Dangerously. Style parody of 1920s and 1930s music	3:06
10.	"Cable TV"	Yankovic	Style parody of "Hercules" by Elton John	3:38
11.	"Hooked on Polkas"	Various	A polka medley including: "12th Street Rag" by Euday L. Bowman; "State of Shock" by the Jacksons and Mick Jagger; "Sharp Dressed Man" by ZZ Top; "What's Love Got to Do with It" by Tina Turner; "Method of Modern Love" by Hall & Oates; "Owner of a Lonely Heart" by Yes; "We're Not Gonna Take It" by Twisted Sister; "99 Luftballons" by Nena; "Footloose" by Kenny Loggins; "The Reflex" by Duran Duran; "Metal Health (Bang Your Head)" by Quiet Riot; "Relax" by Frankie Goes to Hollywood; "Ear Booker Polka" by "Weird Al" Yankovic	3:53
Total length:				37:04

=== Polka Party! (1986) ===
Side one
No.	Title	Writer(s)	Parody of	Length
1.	"Living with a Hernia"	Daniel Hartman, Charlie Midnight, Alfred Yankovic	"Living in America" by James Brown	3:20
2.	"Dog Eat Dog"	Yankovic	Style parody of Talking Heads	3:42
3.	"Addicted to Spuds"	Robert Palmer, Yankovic	"Addicted to Love" by Robert Palmer	3:50
4.	"One of Those Days"	Yankovic	Original in the style of Glam Rock	3:18
5.	"Polka Party!"	Various	A polka medley including: "Sledgehammer" by Peter Gabriel; "Sussudio" by Phil Collins; "Party All the Time" by Eddie Murphy; "Say You, Say Me" by Lionel Richie; "Freeway of Love" by Aretha Franklin; "What You Need" by INXS; "Harlem Shuffle" (as "Harlem Polka") by The Rolling Stones; "Venus" by Bananarama; "Nasty" by Janet Jackson; "Rock Me Amadeus" by Falco; "Shout" by Tears for Fears; "Papa Don't Preach" by Madonna; "Ear Booker Polka" by "Weird Al" Yankovic	3:15

Side two
No.	Title	Writer(s)	Parody of	Length
6.	"Here's Johnny"	Peter Wolf, Ina Wolf, Yankovic	"Who's Johnny" by El DeBarge	3:24
7.	"Don't Wear Those Shoes"	Yankovic	Style parody of The Kinks	3:36
8.	"Toothless People"	Daryl Hohl, Michael Jagger, David Stewart, Yankovic	"Ruthless People" by Mick Jagger	3:23
9.	"Good Enough for Now"	Yankovic	Style parody of country love songs	3:03
10.	"Christmas at Ground Zero"	Yankovic	Style parody of Phil Spector-produced Christmas songs	3:09
Total length:				34:07

=== Even Worse (1988) ===
Side one
No.	Title	Writer(s)	Parody of	Length
1.	"Fat"	Michael Jackson, Alfred Yankovic	"Bad" by Michael Jackson	3:37
2.	"Stuck in a Closet with Vanna White"	Yankovic	Original glam rock song	4:58
3.	"(This Song's Just) Six Words Long"	Rudy Clark, Yankovic	"Got My Mind Set on You" by George Harrison	3:37
4.	"You Make Me"	Yankovic	Style parody of Oingo Boingo	3:06
5.	"I Think I'm a Clone Now"	Ritchie Cordell, Yankovic	"I Think We're Alone Now" by Tiffany	3:20

Side two
No.	Title	Writer(s)	Parody of	Length
6.	"Lasagna"	Yankovic	"La Bamba" by Los Lobos	2:46
7.	"Melanie"	Yankovic	Original	3:58
8.	"Alimony"	Tommy James, Bo Gentry, Ritchie Cordell, Robert Bloom, Yankovic	"Mony Mony" by Billy Idol	3:16
9.	"Velvet Elvis"	Yankovic	Style parody of the Police	4:30
10.	"Twister"	Yankovic	Style parody of Beastie Boys	1:03
11.	"Good Old Days"	Yankovic	Style parody of James Taylor	3:21
Total length:				37:32

=== UHF – Original Motion Picture Soundtrack and Other Stuff (1989) ===
Side one
No.	Title	Writer(s)	Parody of	Length
1.	"Money for Nothing/Beverly Hillbillies"	Mark Knopfler, Gordon Sumner, Paul Henning, Alfred Yankovic	"Money for Nothing" by Dire Straits with lyrics of "The Ballad of Jed Clampett" by Flatt & Scruggs	3:11
2.	"Gandhi II"	Yankovic	Skit	1:00
3.	"Attack of the Radioactive Hamsters from a Planet Near Mars"	Yankovic	Original	3:28
4.	"Isle Thing"	Matthew Dike, Michael Ross, Yankovic	"Wild Thing" by Tone Lōc	3:37
5.	"The Hot Rocks Polka"	Various	A polka medley of Rolling Stones songs: "It's Only Rock 'n Roll (But I Like It)"; "Brown Sugar"; "You Can't Always Get What You Want"; "Honky Tonk Women"; "Under My Thumb"; "Ruby Tuesday"; "Miss You"; "Sympathy for the Devil"; "Get Off of My Cloud"; "Shattered"; "Let's Spend the Night Together"; "(I Can't Get No) Satisfaction"; "Ear Booker Polka" by "Weird Al" Yankovic	4:50
6.	"UHF"	Yankovic	Original	5:09

Side two
No.	Title	Writer(s)	Parody of	Length
7.	"Let Me Be Your Hog"	Yankovic	Original	0:16
8.	"She Drives Like Crazy"	Roland Gift, David Steele, Yankovic	"She Drives Me Crazy" by Fine Young Cannibals	3:42
9.	"Generic Blues"	Yankovic	Style parody of the blues	4:34
10.	"Spatula City"	Yankovic	Skit	1:07
11.	"Fun Zone"	Yankovic	Instrumental	1:45
12.	"Spam"	William Berry, Peter Buck, Michael Mills, John Stipe, Yankovic	"Stand" by R.E.M.	3:12
13.	"The Biggest Ball of Twine in Minnesota"	Yankovic	Style parody of Harry Chapin and Gordon Lightfoot	6:50
Total length:				42:28

=== Off the Deep End (1992) ===
Original compact disc release
No.	Title	Writer(s)	Parody of	Length
1.	"Smells Like Nirvana"	Kurt Cobain, David Grohl, Krist Novoselic, Alfred Yankovic	"Smells Like Teen Spirit" by Nirvana	3:42
2.	"Trigger Happy"	Yankovic	Style parody of the Beach Boys and Jan & Dean	3:46
3.	"I Can't Watch This"	Stanley Burrell, James Johnson Jr., Alonzo Miller, Yankovic	"U Can't Touch This" by MC Hammer	3:31
4.	"Polka Your Eyes Out"	Various	A polka medley including: "Cradle of Love" by Billy Idol; "Tom's Diner" by Suzanne Vega; "Love Shack" by The B-52's; "Clarinet Polka" (Public domain); "Pump Up the Jam" by Technotronic; "Losing My Religion" by R.E.M.; "Unbelievable" by EMF; "Do Me!" by Bell Biv DeVoe; "Enter Sandman" by Metallica; "The Humpty Dance" by Digital Underground; "Cherry Pie" by Warrant; "Miss You Much" by Janet Jackson; "I Touch Myself" by Divinyls; "Dr. Feelgood" by Mötley Crüe; "Ice Ice Baby" by Vanilla Ice; "Ear Booker Polka" by "Weird Al" Yankovic	3:50
5.	"I Was Only Kidding"	Yankovic	Style parody of Tonio K	3:31
6.	"The White Stuff"	Larry Johnson, Yankovic	"You Got It (The Right Stuff)" by New Kids on the Block	2:43
7.	"When I Was Your Age"	Yankovic	Original	4:35
8.	"Taco Grande"	Christian Carlos Warren, Gerardo Mejia, Alberto Slezynger, and Rosa Soy, Yankovic	"Rico Suave" by Gerardo	3:44
9.	"Airline Amy"	Yankovic	Original composition inspired by the songs of Nick Lowe and Jonathan Richman	3:50
10.	"The Plumbing Song"	Frank Farian, B. Nail, Diane Warren, Yankovic	"Baby Don't Forget My Number" and "Blame It on the Rain" by Milli Vanilli	4:08
11.	"You Don't Love Me Anymore" (includes hidden track (Note: After 10 minutes of silence, the hidden track "Bite Me" is "six seconds of primal screaming". The hidden track (and silence) was removed from future pressings and digital versions.))	Yankovic	Style parody of Nicolette Larson	14:14
Total length:				41:18

=== Alapalooza (1993) ===
No.	Title	Writer(s)	Parody of	Length
1.	"Jurassic Park"	Jimmy Webb, Al Yankovic	"MacArthur Park" by Richard Harris	3:55
2.	"Young, Dumb & Ugly"	Yankovic	Style parody of AC/DC	4:24
3.	"Bedrock Anthem"	Anthony Kiedis, John Frusciante, Michael "Flea" Balzary, Chad Smith, Yankovic	"Under the Bridge" and "Give It Away" by Red Hot Chili Peppers	3:43
4.	"Frank's 2000″ TV"	Yankovic	Style parody of R.E.M.'s early work	4:07
5.	"Achy Breaky Song"	Don Von Tress, Yankovic	"Achy Breaky Heart" by Billy Ray Cyrus	3:23
6.	"Traffic Jam"	Yankovic	Style parody of Prince	4:01
7.	"Talk Soup"	Yankovic	Original; rejected theme song commissioned for the television series of the same name	4:25
8.	"Livin' in the Fridge"	Steven Tyler, Anthony Pereira, Mark Hudson, Yankovic	"Livin' on the Edge" by Aerosmith	3:35
9.	"She Never Told Me She Was a Mime"	Yankovic	Original glam rock song	4:54
10.	"Harvey the Wonder Hamster"	Yankovic	Original; from Al TV	0:21
11.	"Waffle King"	Yankovic	Style parody of Peter Gabriel	4:25
12.	"Bohemian Polka"	Freddie Mercury, Yankovic	Polka version of "Bohemian Rhapsody" by Queen with "Ear Booker Polka" by "Weird Al" Yankovic	3:39
Total length:				44:34

=== Bad Hair Day (1996) ===
No.	Title	Writer(s)	Parody of	Length
1.	"Amish Paradise"	Artis Ivey Jr., Doug Rasheed, Larry Sanders, Stevland Morris, Alfred Yankovic	"Gangsta's Paradise" by Coolio feat. L.V.	3:20
2.	"Everything You Know Is Wrong"	Yankovic	Style parody of They Might Be Giants	3:47
3.	"Cavity Search"	Paul Hewson, David Evans, Adam Clayton, Laurence Mullen Jr., Yankovic	"Hold Me, Thrill Me, Kiss Me, Kill Me" by U2	4:16
4.	"Callin' In Sick"	Yankovic	Original grunge song	3:41
5.	"The Alternative Polka"	Various	A polka medley including: "Loser" by Beck; "Sex Type Thing" by Stone Temple Pilots; "All I Wanna Do" by Sheryl Crow; "Closer" by Nine Inch Nails; "Bang and Blame" by R.E.M.; "You Oughta Know" by Alanis Morissette; "Bullet with Butterfly Wings" by The Smashing Pumpkins; "My Friends" by Red Hot Chili Peppers; "I'll Stick Around" by Foo Fighters; "Black Hole Sun" by Soundgarden; "Basket Case" by Green Day; "Ear Booker Polka" by "Weird Al" Yankovic	5:00
6.	"Since You've Been Gone"	Yankovic	Original a capella song	1:20
7.	"Gump"	Christopher Ballew, Yankovic	"Lump" by the Presidents of the United States of America	2:11
8.	"I'm So Sick of You"	Yankovic	Style parody of Elvis Costello	3:25
9.	"Syndicated Inc."	David Pirner, Yankovic	"Misery" by Soul Asylum	3:46
10.	"I Remember Larry"	Yankovic	Style parody of Hilly Michaels	3:55
11.	"Phony Calls"	Marqueze Etheridge, Lisa Lopes, Organized Noize, Yankovic	"Waterfalls" by TLC	3:21
12.	"The Night Santa Went Crazy"	Yankovic	Style Parody of Soul Asylum, specifically, "Black Gold."	3:59
Total length:				42:13

=== Running with Scissors (1999) ===
No.	Title	Writer(s)	Parody of	Length
1.	"The Saga Begins"	Donald McLean III, Alfred Yankovic	"American Pie" by Don McLean	5:27
2.	"My Baby's in Love with Eddie Vedder"	Yankovic	Original Zydeco song	3:25
3.	"Pretty Fly for a Rabbi"	Bryan Holland, Yankovic	"Pretty Fly (for a White Guy)" by the Offspring	3:02
4.	"The Weird Al Show Theme"	Yankovic	Original; from The Weird Al Show	1:14
5.	"Jerry Springer"	Ed Robertson, Yankovic	"One Week" by Barenaked Ladies	2:46
6.	"Germs"	Yankovic	Style parody of Nine Inch Nails	4:38
7.	"Polka Power!"	Various	A polka medley including: "Wannabe" by the Spice Girls; "Flagpole Sitta" by Harvey Danger; "Ghetto Supastar (That Is What You Are)" by Pras, Ol' Dirty Bastard and Mýa; "Everybody (Backstreet's Back)" by the Backstreet Boys; "Walkin' on the Sun" by Smash Mouth; "Intergalactic" by the Beastie Boys; "Tubthumping" by Chumbawamba; "Ray of Light" by Madonna; "Push" by Matchbox Twenty; "Semi-Charmed Life" by Third Eye Blind; "The Dope Show" by Marilyn Manson; "MMMBop" by Hanson; "Sex and Candy" by Marcy Playground; "Closing Time" by Semisonic; "W.A.Y. Moby Polka" by "Weird Al" Yankovic	4:20
8.	"Your Horoscope for Today"	Yankovic	Style parody of Reel Big Fish and other 1990s third-wave ska	4:00
9.	"It's All About the Pentiums"	Sean Combs, Sean Jacobs, Jason Phillips, David Styles, Christopher Wallace, Kimberly Jones, Deric Angelettie, Yankovic	"It's All About the Benjamins" (Rock Remix) by Puff Daddy	3:34
10.	"Truck Drivin' Song"	Yankovic	Original truck-driving country song	2:27
11.	"Grapefruit Diet"	Stephen Perry, Yankovic	"Zoot Suit Riot" by Cherry Poppin' Daddies	3:30
12.	"Albuquerque"	Yankovic	Style parody of the Rugburns, George Thorogood, and Mojo Nixon	11:22
Total length:				49:44

=== Poodle Hat (2003) ===
No.	Title	Writer(s)	Parody of	Length
1.	"Couch Potato"	Jeffrey Bass, Marshall Mathers III, Luis Resto, Alfred Yankovic	"Lose Yourself" by Eminem	4:18
2.	"Hardware Store"	Yankovic	Original	3:44
3.	"Trash Day"	Charles Brown, Cornell Haynes Jr., Pharrell Williams, Yankovic	"Hot in Herre" by Nelly	3:12
4.	"Party at the Leper Colony"	Yankovic	Style parody of the Bo Diddley beat	3:38
5.	"Angry White Boy Polka"	Various	A polka medley including: "Last Resort" by Papa Roach; "Chop Suey!" by System of a Down; "Get Free" by the Vines; "Hate to Say I Told You So" by the Hives; "Fell in Love with a Girl" by the White Stripes; "Last Nite" by the Strokes; "Down with the Sickness" by Disturbed; "Renegades of Funk" by Rage Against the Machine, originally by Afrika Bambaataa; "My Way" by Limp Bizkit; "Outside" by Staind; "Bawitdaba" by Kid Rock; "Youth of the Nation" by P.O.D.; "The Real Slim Shady" by Eminem; "Poodle Hat Polka" by "Weird Al" Yankovic	5:04
6.	"Wanna B Ur Lovr"	Yankovic	Style parody of Midnite Vultures-era Beck	6:14
7.	"A Complicated Song"	Avril Lavigne, Yankovic	"Complicated" by Avril Lavigne	3:40
8.	"Why Does This Always Happen to Me?"	Yankovic	Style parody of Ben Folds	4:52
9.	"Ode to a Superhero"	Billy Joel, Yankovic	"Piano Man" by Billy Joel	4:53
10.	"Bob"	Yankovic	Style parody of Bob Dylan	2:29
11.	"eBay"	Andreas Carlsson, Martin Sandberg, Yankovic	"I Want It That Way" by Backstreet Boys	3:36
12.	"Genius in France"	Yankovic	Style parody of Frank Zappa	8:58
Total length:				54:38

=== Straight Outta Lynwood (2006) ===
No.	Title	Writer(s)	Parody of	Length
1.	"White & Nerdy"	Hakeem Seriki, Juan Salinas, Oscar Salinas, Anthony Henderson, Alfred Yankovic	"Ridin'" by Chamillionaire featuring Krayzie Bone	2:50
2.	"Pancreas"	Yankovic	Style parody of Brian Wilson	3:48
3.	"Canadian Idiot"	Billie Joe Armstrong, Yankovic	"American Idiot" by Green Day	2:23
4.	"I'll Sue Ya"	Yankovic	Style parody of Rage Against the Machine	3:51
5.	"Polkarama!"	Various; arranged by Yankovic	A polka medley including: "Chicken Dance" by Werner Thomas; "Let's Get It Started" by The Black Eyed Peas; "Take Me Out" by Franz Ferdinand; "Beverly Hills" by Weezer; "Speed of Sound" by Coldplay; "Float On" by Modest Mouse; "Feel Good Inc." by Gorillaz featuring De La Soul; "Don't Cha" by Pussycat Dolls featuring Busta Rhymes; "Somebody Told Me" by The Killers; "Slither" by Velvet Revolver; "Candy Shop" by 50 Cent featuring Olivia; "Drop It Like It's Hot" by Snoop Dogg featuring Pharrell; "Pon de Replay" by Rihanna; "Gold Digger" by Kanye West featuring Jamie Foxx; "The Nina Bobina Polka" by "Weird Al" Yankovic	4:17
6.	"Virus Alert"	Yankovic	Style parody of Sparks	3:46
7.	"Confessions Part III"	Usher Raymond IV, Jermaine Mauldin, Bryan-Michael Cox, Yankovic	"Confessions Part II" by Usher	3:52
8.	"Weasel Stomping Day"	Yankovic	Style parody of animated musical specials of the 1960s	1:34
9.	"Close but No Cigar"	Yankovic	Style parody of Cake	3:55
10.	"Do I Creep You Out"	Tracy Ackerman, Andy Watkins, Paul Wilson, Yankovic	"Do I Make You Proud" by Taylor Hicks	2:46
11.	"Trapped in the Drive-Thru"	Robert Kelly, James Page, Robert Plant, John Baldwin, Yankovic	"Trapped in the Closet" by R. Kelly; contains an interpolation of "Black Dog" by Led Zeppelin	10:50
12.	"Don't Download This Song"	Yankovic	Style parody of 1980s charity songs	3:54
Total length:				47:45

=== Alpocalypse (2011) ===
No.	Title	Writer(s)	Parody of	Length
1.	"Perform This Way"	Stefani Germanotta, Jeppe Laursen, Paul Blair, Fernando Garibay, Alfred Yankovic	"Born This Way" by Lady Gaga	2:54
2.	"CNR"	Yankovic	Style parody of The White Stripes	3:21
3.	"TMZ"	Taylor Swift, Liz Rose, Yankovic	"You Belong with Me" by Taylor Swift	3:40
4.	"Skipper Dan"	Yankovic	Style parody of Weezer	4:01
5.	"Polka Face"	Various	A polka medley including: "Liechtensteiner Polka" (0:18); "Poker Face" by Lady Gaga (0:24); "Womanizer" by Britney Spears (0:23); "Right Round" by Flo Rida featuring Kesha (0:12); "Day 'n' Nite" by Kid Cudi (0:12); "Need You Now" by Lady Antebellum (0:18); "Baby" by Justin Bieber featuring Ludacris (0:10); "So What" by Pink (0:28); "I Kissed a Girl" by Katy Perry (0:21); "Fireflies" by Owl City (0:16); "Blame It" by Jamie Foxx featuring T-Pain (0:16); "Replay" by Iyaz (0:12); "Down" by Jay Sean featuring Lil Wayne (0:11); "Break Your Heart" by Taio Cruz featuring Ludacris (0:12); "The Tick Tock Polka" by Frankie Yankovic (0:11); "Tik Tok" by Kesha (0:13); "Whatever's Left Over Polka" (0:30)	4:47
6.	"Craigslist"	Yankovic	Style parody of The Doors	4:53
7.	"Party in the CIA"	Lukasz Gottwald, Claude Kelly, Jessica Cornish, Yankovic	"Party in the U.S.A." by Miley Cyrus	2:56
8.	"Ringtone"	Yankovic	Style parody of Queen	3:24
9.	"Another Tattoo"	Bobby Simmons Jr., Peter Hernandez, Philip Lawrence, Ari Levine, Yankovic	"Nothin' on You" by B.o.B featuring Bruno Mars	2:49
10.	"If That Isn't Love"	Yankovic	Style parody of Hanson	3:48
11.	"Whatever You Like"	Clifford Harris Jr., James Scheffer, David Siegel, Yankovic	"Whatever You Like" by T.I.	3:41
12.	"Stop Forwarding That Crap to Me"	Yankovic	Style parody of Jim Steinman	5:42
Total length:				45:56

=== Mandatory Fun (2014) ===
Mandatory Fun track listing
No.	Title	Writer(s)	Parody of	Length
1.	"Handy"	Amethyst Kelly; Charlotte Aitchison; George Astasio; Jason Pebworth; Jonathan Shave; Kurtis McKenzie; Jon Turner; Al Yankovic	"Fancy" by Iggy Azalea featuring Charli XCX	2:56
2.	"Lame Claim to Fame"	Yankovic	Style parody of Southern Culture on the Skids	3:45
3.	"Foil"	Joel Little; Ella Yelich-O'Connor; Yankovic	"Royals" by Lorde	2:22
4.	"Sports Song"	Yankovic	Style parody of college football fight songs	2:14
5.	"Word Crimes"	Robin Thicke; Pharrell Williams; Clifford Harris Jr.; Marvin Gaye^{1}; Yankovic	"Blurred Lines" by Robin Thicke featuring T.I. and Pharrell Williams	3:43
6.	"My Own Eyes"	Yankovic	Style parody of Foo Fighters	3:40
7.	"Now That's What I Call Polka!"	Various writers: Yankovic; Ross MacLean; Arthur Richardson; Lukasz Gottwald; Maureen McDonald; Stephan Moccio; Sacha Skarbek; Henry Walter; Mark Foster; Wayne Hector; John Ryan; Edward Drewett; Julian Bunetta; Park Jai-sang; Yoo Gun-hyung; Carly Rae Jepsen; Josh Ramsay; Tavish Crowe; William Adams; Jef Martens; Jean Kouame; Walter de Backer; Luiz Bonfá; Kesha Sebert; Armando Pérez; Priscilla Hamilton; Jamie Sanderson; Breyan Isaac; Henry Walter; Lee Oskar; Keri Oskar; Greg Errico; Stefan Gordy; Skyler Gordy; David Listenbee; Erin Beck; George Robertson; Kenny Oliver; Ben Haggerty; Ryan Lewis; Thomas Bangalter; Guillaume de Homem-Christo; Williams; Nile Rodgers	A polka medley including: "Too Fat Polka" by Arthur Godfrey; "Wrecking Ball" by Miley Cyrus; "Pumped Up Kicks" by Foster the People; "Best Song Ever" by One Direction; "Gangnam Style" by Psy; "Call Me Maybe" by Carly Rae Jepsen; "Scream & Shout" by will.i.am featuring Britney Spears; "Somebody That I Used to Know" by Gotye featuring Kimbra; "Timber" by Pitbull featuring Kesha; "Sexy and I Know It" by LMFAO; "Thrift Shop" by Macklemore and Ryan Lewis featuring Wanz; "Get Lucky" by Daft Punk featuring Pharrell Williams; "Mandatory Polka" by "Weird Al" Yankovic	4:05
8.	"Mission Statement"	Yankovic	Style parody of Crosby, Stills & Nash, specifically "Carry On" and "Suite: Judy Blue Eyes"	4:28
9.	"Inactive"	Alexander Grant; Daniel Reynolds; Daniel Sermon; Benjamin McKee; Joshua Mosser; Yankovic	"Radioactive" by Imagine Dragons	2:56
10.	"First World Problems"	Yankovic	Style parody of Pixies	3:13
11.	"Tacky"	Williams; Yankovic	"Happy" by Pharrell Williams	2:53
12.	"Jackson Park Express"	Yankovic	Style parody of Cat Stevens	9:05
Total length:				45:20

=== Medium Rarities ===
Medium Rarities

Compilation album by "Weird Al" Yankovic
- Released: November 24, 2017
- Genre: Comedy
- Length: 51:58
- Labels: Legacy; Way Moby

Medium Rarities is the name of the fifteenth album included in Squeeze Box. This release, exclusive to this box set, is composed entirely of rare and unreleased tracks from Yankovic's career.

No.	Title	Writer(s)	Notes	Length
1.	"Take Me Down"	Al Yankovic	A parody of "Take Me Down", speaking about going to San Luis Obispo	2:28
2.	"My Bologna"	Doug Fieger; Berton Averre; Yankovic	Capitol single version; parody of "My Sharona" by the Knack	2:20
3.	"Yoda"	Ray Davies; Yankovic	Demo; parody of "Lola" by the Kinks	3:27
4.	"Dr. Demento Jingle"	Yankovic	Original	0:10
5.	"Pac-Man"	George Harrison; Yankovic	Parody of "Taxman" by the Beatles	2:31
6.	"Dare to Be Stupid"	Yankovic	Instrumental; style parody of Devo	3:23
7.	"Jurashiku Park"	Jimmy Webb; Yankovic	"Jurassic Park" sung in Japanese; parody of "MacArthur Park" by Richard Harris	3:53
8.	"Headline News"	Brad Roberts; Yankovic	Parody of "Mmm Mmm Mmm Mmm" by Crash Test Dummies	3:46
9.	"Since You've Been Gone"	Yankovic	Karaoke version	1:20
10.	"The Night Santa Went Crazy"	Yankovic	"Extra Gory Version"	4:03
11.	"Spy Hard"	Yankovic	Theme to Spy Hard	2:49
12.	"Lousy Haircut"	Yankovic	From the Weird Al Show episode "Promises, Promises"; style parody of "Firestarter" by the Prodigy	0:40
13.	"Homer and Marge"	John Mellencamp; Yankovic	From the episode "Three Gays of the Condo" of The Simpsons; parody of "Jack & Diane" by John Mellencamp	1:49
14.	"The Brain Song"	Yankovic	From the 3-D short film Al's Brain	2:41
15.	"30 Rock Theme Parody"	Jeff Richmond; Yankovic	From an episode of 30 Rock; parody of "30 Rock Theme" composed by Jeff Richmond	0:30
16.	"Super Duper Party Pony"	Daniel Ingram; Amy Keating Rogers; Yankovic	From the episode "Pinkie Pride" of My Little Pony: Friendship Is Magic	1:46
17.	"Sir Isaac Newton vs. Bill Nye"	Peter Shukoff; Lloyd Ahlquist; Yankovic	From the webseries Epic Rap Battles of History	2:47
18.	"Let the Pun Fit the Crime"	Andy Bean; Francisco Angones	From the episode "The Boy Wander" of Wander Over Yonder	2:10
19.	"Hey, Hey, We're the Monks"	Alan Menken; Christopher Lennertz; Glenn Slater	From the episode "Completely Mad... Alena" of Galavant	1:16
20.	"Comedy Bang! Bang! Theme"	Reggie Watts	Theme to Comedy Bang! Bang! (Season 5 only)	0:30
21.	"It's My World (And We're All Living In It)"	Dan Povenmire	Theme to Milo Murphy's Law	2:27
22.	"Beat on the Brat"	Jeffrey Hyman	Ramones cover	2:37
23.	"Happy Birthday"	Yankovic	New version	2:35
Total length:				51:58

==== "Pac-Man" ====
One of the first rarities announced for the album was "Pac-Man", a parody of the Beatles' song "Taxman" that discusses the arcade game of the same name. Recorded in 1981 in a garage using a TEAC Cassette Portastudio, the song features sampled sounds from the actual Pac-Man arcade game. After the song was played for a time on Dr. Demento's radio program, the host received a cease-and-desist letter from the Beatles' lawyers ordering him to stop airing the spoof. In order to get the song on the Medium Rarities album, Yankovic had to get permission from both Bandai Namco Entertainment (the company that owns the rights to Pac-Man) and the estate of George Harrison (the writer of "Taxman"). The former "had a good sense of humor about" the parody. To clear the parody with the Harrison estate, Yankovic worked with Dhani Harrison, the son of George Harrison.

== Accolades ==
Squeeze Box won the 2019 Grammy Award for Best Boxed or Special Limited Edition Package. As one of the box set's art directors, Yankovic received the award along with the other art directors, Meghan Foley and Annie Stoll.

== Charts ==
Chart (2017)	Peak position
US Billboard 200	185
US Top Comedy Albums (Billboard)	1
