= Permanent Record: Al in the Box =

Box set by "Weird Al" Yankovic
- Released: September 27, 1994
- Recorded: September 1979 – April 1994
- Genre: Comedy
- Length: 3:00:27
- Labels: Rock 'n Roll Records; Scotti Brothers
- Producers: "Weird Al" Yankovic, Rick Derringer

"Weird Al" Yankovic chronology
Alapalooza (1993)	Permanent Record: Al in the Box (1994)	Greatest Hits Volume II (1994)

Singles from Permanent Record: Al in the Box
- 1. "Headline News" Released: September 27, 1994

Permanent Record: Al in the Box is a four-disc compilation box set of songs by "Weird Al" Yankovic, released on September 27, 1994. The album, released by Scotti Brothers Records so that the label could make monetary projections for the fiscal year, collects Yankovic's favorite songs from his first eight studio albums. The collection also includes alternate versions of "My Bologna", "Happy Birthday", "UHF", and the new single, "Headline News", a parody of "Mmm Mmm Mmm Mmm" by Crash Test Dummies. It peaked at number four on the Billboard Bubbling Under Hot 100 chart.

The collection was met with mostly positive critical reviews, with many appreciating the gathering of some of Yankovic's best works. However, the box set was not a high seller, and near the end of the 1990s, it ranked as Yankovic's least-purchased album. In 2006, due to a mishap by Volcano Records, the artwork for the set was lost. Because Yankovic refused to scan existing copies of the album to make new ones, fearing that it would lead to an inferior product, the physical set is now out of print. Yankovic would later release a second box set called Squeeze Box: The Complete Works of "Weird Al" Yankovic in 2017.

== Production ==
=== Release and music ===
While Yankovic was writing the original songs for a new album—which would later be released in 1996 as Bad Hair Day—his label, Scotti Brothers Records, insisted that he release a new record to meet monetary projections for the fourth fiscal quarter of the year. Yankovic, however, explained that he would be unable to finish a new record in time, so his label decided to release a box set that eventually was named Permanent Record: Al in the Box. The label then stipulated that Yankovic would need to at least record a new single to promote the box set. Yankovic complied, producing the parody "Headline News", a spoof of "Mmm Mmm Mmm Mmm" by Crash Test Dummies, which would also appear on his second greatest hits album.

While most of the songs that appear on this record can be found on Yankovic's first eight studio albums, there are several unique inclusions. The version of "My Bologna" is the Capitol Records single version, which only featured the accordion and Yankovic's voice. Early pressings of the album included the incorrect version of "My Bologna", but this was later rectified in subsequent pressings. The version of "Happy Birthday" included was previously released on the 1981 independent Another One Rides the Bus EP. Finally, the third disc contains the single edit of "UHF" as opposed to the lengthier version available on UHF – Original Motion Picture Soundtrack and Other Stuff; this was done because Yankovic figured that "fans would appreciate having both versions available."

=== Title and artwork ===
Both "Permanent Record" and "Al in the Box" were titles proposed by Yankovic; however, he favored the former, whereas his label preferred the latter. Both parties, being unwilling to yield, eventually decided to compromise and name the release Permanent Record: Al in the Box. The album also included a detailed booklet, written by Yankovic's long-time associate, Dr. Demento. When Yankovic's recording contract was transferred from Scotti Brothers to Volcano in the late 1990s, the artwork for the set was lost, causing the set to go out of print; although Yankovic noted that the label "could just scan existing booklets and CD art and crank out boxed sets with slightly inferior graphics," he did not want to put out a product that was not up to his usual standards.

== Reception ==
=== Critical response ===
Professional ratings
Review scores
Source	Rating
AllMusic	4.5/5 stars
The Rolling Stone Album Guide	3.5/5 stars
Spin	(positive)

Barry Weber of AllMusic awarded the album four-and-a-half stars out of five, and argued that "no [other greatest hits album of Yankovic's] matches Permanent Record, a four-CD set of Yankovic's best songs". He applauded many of the parodies, and called several of them—namely "My Bologna", "Eat It", "Like a Surgeon", "Yoda", "Fat", and "Smells Like Nirvana"—"defining satires". He also wrote that the originals contained on the record were "overlooked but equally entertaining". Nathan Brackett and Christian Hoard, in The Rolling Stone Album Guide, awarded the album three-and-a-half stars out of five, denoting that the album averaged between good and excellent. Craig Rosen of Billboard magazine opined that the album "will remind consumers that Yankovic has outlasted" many of his past parody targets. Chuck Eddy of Spin magazine named the album the fourth most "essential" comedy record, writing that album is proof "for fifth-grade smart alecks, no rock star is greater" than Yankovic.

=== Commercial performance ===
The box set was released on September 27, 1994. As of January 1997, the set was Yankovic's worst-selling album, trailing all of his studio releases, as well as his various compilation and greatest hits albums. On March 1, 2006, the record went out of print, due to the aforementioned loss of the artwork. The collection's only single, "Headline News", charted and peaked at number four on the Billboard Bubbling Under Hot 100 chart.

== Track listing ==
=== Disc one ===
1. "My Bologna" (orig. Doug Fieger, Berton Averre, arr. "Weird Al" Yankovic) – 2:20 (2:01 on misprint edition)
  - Parody of "My Sharona" by The Knack; the narrator talks about his obsession with bologna sausage. This version is the 1979 Capitol Records version of the song.
2. "Another One Rides the Bus" (orig. John Deacon, arr. Yankovic) – 2:36
  - Parody of "Another One Bites the Dust" by Queen; the narrator laments a crowded public bus. From the 1983 album "Weird Al" Yankovic.
3. "Happy Birthday" (Yankovic) – 2:36
  - Style parody of Tonio K; the song is a morbidly depressing birthday greeting detailing ails of the world. From the 1981 EP Another One Rides the Bus.
4. "I Love Rocky Road" (orig. Jake Hooker, arr. Yankovic) – 2:36
  - Parody of "I Love Rock 'n' Roll" by Joan Jett; the narrator expresses his love towards the titular ice cream flavor. From the 1983 album "Weird Al" Yankovic.
5. "Ricky" (orig. Mike Chapman, Nicky Chinn, arr. Yankovic) – 2:36
  - Parody of "Mickey" by Toni Basil; this is an ode to I Love Lucy with Yankovic playing the part of Ricky and Tress MacNeille as Lucy. From the 1983 album "Weird Al" Yankovic.
6. "Polkas on 45" (Polka medley, arr. Yankovic) – 4:23
  - This was Yankovic's first polka medley of popular songs. From the 1984 album "Weird Al" Yankovic in 3-D.
7. "Midnight Star" (Yankovic) – 4:35
  - Original; this song is about ludicrous supermarket tabloids. From the 1984 album "Weird Al" Yankovic in 3-D.
8. "Eat It" (orig. Michael Jackson, arr. "Weird Al" Yankovic) – 3:21
  - Parody of "Beat It" by Michael Jackson; a song about a parent's exasperating quest to get their picky child to eat. From the 1984 album "Weird Al" Yankovic in 3-D.
9. "Mr. Popeil" (Yankovic) – 4:42
  - A style parody of the B-52s; about the inventor Samuel Popeil, his myriad inventions of varying usefulness, and his son Ron's infomercials. From the 1984 album "Weird Al" Yankovic in 3-D.
10. "I Lost on Jeopardy" (orig. Greg Kihn, Steve Wright, arr. Yankovic) – 3:28
  - Parody of "Jeopardy" by The Greg Kihn Band; a Jeopardy! contestant details why he lost. From the 1984 album "Weird Al" Yankovic in 3-D.
11. "Buy Me a Condo" (Yankovic) – 3:51
  - Style parody of Bob Marley and reggae; a Rastafarian sings about giving up his lifestyle to become a yuppie. From the 1984 album "Weird Al" Yankovic in 3-D.
12. "King of Suede" (orig. Sting, arr. Yankovic) – 4:14
  - Parody of "King of Pain" by The Police; a song about the world's greatest fabric salesman. From the 1984 album "Weird Al" Yankovic in 3-D.

=== Disc two ===
1. "Yoda" (orig. Ray Davies, arr. Yankovic) – 3:58
  - Parody of "Lola" by The Kinks; the spoof describes the Dagobah-setting events of The Empire Strikes Back as told from the point of view of Luke Skywalker. From the 1985 album Dare to Be Stupid.
2. "This Is the Life" (Yankovic) – 3:06
  - Style parody of 1920s and 1930s music; the singer brags about his lavish lifestyle. From the 1985 album Dare to Be Stupid. Theme to the Michael Keaton film, Johnny Dangerously.
3. "Like a Surgeon" (orig. Billy Steinberg, Tom Kelly, arr. Yankovic) – 3:32
  - Parody of "Like a Virgin" by Madonna; the song is about an incompetent surgeon performing surgery. From the 1985 album Dare to Be Stupid.
4. "One More Minute" (Yankovic) – 4:04
  - Style parody of Elvis Presley-like Doo-wop; the song describes the myriad tortures that the singer would sooner endure than spending "one more minute" with his ex-girlfriend. From the 1985 album Dare to Be Stupid.
5. "I Want a New Duck" (orig. Chris Hayes, Huey Lewis, arr. Yankovic) – 3:04
  - Parody of "I Want a New Drug" by Huey Lewis and the News; this is a song about how much the singer wants a better pet duck. From the 1985 album Dare to Be Stupid.
6. "Dare to Be Stupid" (Yankovic) – 3:25
  - Style parody of Devo; the song recounts a list of "stupid" things a person can do. From the 1985 album Dare to Be Stupid.
7. "Hooked on Polkas" (Polka medley, arr. Yankovic) – 3:50
  - A polka medley including songs popular in 1984 and 1985. From the 1985 album Dare to Be Stupid.
8. "Addicted to Spuds" (orig. Robert Palmer, arr. Yankovic) – 3:50
  - "Addicted to Love" by Robert Palmer; a song about a man's obsession for potatoes and potato-based dishes. From the 1986 album Polka Party!.
9. "Dog Eat Dog" (Yankovic) – 3:42
  - Style parody of Talking Heads; the narrator describes his experience in an office building. From the 1986 album Polka Party!.
10. "Here's Johnny" (orig. Peter Wolf, Ina Wolf, arr. Yankovic) – 3:24
  - Parody of "Who's Johnny" by El DeBarge; the song is an ode to Ed McMahon. From the 1986 album Polka Party!.
11. "Living with a Hernia" (orig. Dan Hartman, Charlie Midnight, arr. Yankovic) – 3:20
  - Parody of "Living in America" by James Brown; the song discusses various types of hernias. From the 1986 album Polka Party!.
12. "Christmas at Ground Zero" (Yankovic) – 3:09
  - Style parody of Christmas carols; the song discusses nuclear annihilation during the holidays. From the 1986 album Polka Party!.

=== Disc three ===
1. "Lasagna" (arr. "Weird Al" Yankovic) – 2:46
  - Parody of the folk song "La Bamba"; a song centered largely around Italians and Italian cuisine. From the 1988 album Even Worse.
2. "Good Old Days" (Yankovic) – 3:21
  - Style parody of James Taylor; in this song, a psychopath reminisces his childhood. From the 1988 album Even Worse.
3. "Fat" (orig. Michael Jackson, arr. Yankovic) – 3:37
  - Parody of "Bad" by Michael Jackson; the spoof discusses a man's obesity, which is blown out of proportion. From the 1988 album Even Worse.
4. "Melanie" (Yankovic) – 3:58
  - Original; the song describes a socially inept apartment dweller's attempts to woo his neighbor Melanie. From the 1988 album Even Worse.
5. "I Think I'm a Clone Now" (orig. Ritchie Cordell, arr. Yankovic) – 3:20
  - Parody of "I Think We're Alone Now" as performed by Tiffany; the song is about a man's experiences of being a lab-created identical clone. From the 1988 album Even Worse.
6. "You Make Me" (Yankovic) – 3:06
  - Style parody of Oingo Boingo; the song describes a person's desire to engage in strange behavior compelled by another person. From the 1988 album Even Worse.
7. "Alimony" (orig. Tommy James, Bo Gentry, Ritchie Cordell, Bobby Bloom, arr. Yankovic) – 3:16
  - Parody of "Mony Mony" as performed by Billy Idol; the song discusses a man and his alimony payments to his ex-wife. From the 1988 album Even Worse.
8. "UHF" (single version) (Yankovic) – 3:49
  - Original; this is the theme song to Yankovic's 1989 film UHF. From the 1989 album and soundtrack UHF – Original Motion Picture Soundtrack and Other Stuff.
9. "Money for Nothing/Beverly Hillbillies" (Mark Knopfler, Gordon Sumner, Paul Henning, arr. Yankovic) – 3:11
  - Parody of "Money for Nothing" by Dire Straits; the song features the slightly altered lyrics of the theme song from the television series The Beverly Hillbillies which are set to the tune of Dire Straits's single. From the 1989 album and soundtrack UHF – Original Motion Picture Soundtrack and Other Stuff.
10. "The Biggest Ball of Twine in Minnesota" (Yankovic) – 6:50
  - Style parody of Harry Chapin and Gordon Lightfoot; this is a folk song about a family road trip to a tourist location in Minnesota. (Insert booklet incorrectly gives time as 6:24.) From the 1989 album and soundtrack UHF – Original Motion Picture Soundtrack and Other Stuff.
11. "Spam" (orig. Bill Berry, Peter Buck, Mike Mills, Michael Stipe, arr. Yankovic) – 3:00
  - Parody of "Stand" by R.E.M.; this is an ode to the canned luncheon meat Spam. From the 1989 album and soundtrack UHF – Original Motion Picture Soundtrack and Other Stuff.
12. "Generic Blues" (Yankovic) – 4:34
  - Style parody of the blues; a song with deliberately clichéd and over-the-top lyrics. From the 1989 album and soundtrack UHF – Original Motion Picture Soundtrack and Other Stuff.

=== Disc four ===
1. "Polka Your Eyes Out" (Polka medley, arr. Yankovic) – 3:50
  - A polka medley including songs popular from 1990 to 1992. From the 1992 album Off the Deep End.
2. "You Don't Love Me Anymore" (Yankovic) – 4:00
  - Original; this is a ballad that is addressed to an ex-girlfriend who did numerous exaggerated and deadly things to the oblivious singer. From the 1992 album Off the Deep End.
3. "Smells Like Nirvana" (orig. Kurt Cobain, Dave Grohl, Krist Novoselic, arr. Yankovic) – 3:42
  - Parody of "Smells Like Teen Spirit" by Nirvana; the song pokes fun at the original song's ambiguous and unintelligible lyrics. From the 1992 album Off the Deep End.
4. "When I Was Your Age" (Yankovic) – 4:35
  - Original; the singer tells a child how he never had it as good as he does, but takes it to exaggerated lengths. From the 1992 album Off the Deep End.
5. "I Can't Watch This" (orig. MC Hammer, Rick James, Alonzo Miller, arr. Yankovic) – 3:31
  - Parody of "U Can't Touch This" by MC Hammer; the singer laments the state of television. From the 1992 album Off the Deep End.
6. "Trigger Happy" (Yankovic) – 3:46
  - Style parody of The Beach Boys and Jan & Dean; about a man who has an exaggerated obsession with firearms. From the 1992 album Off the Deep End.
7. "Taco Grande" (orig. Christian Carlos Warren, Gerardo Mejia, Alberto Slezynger, and Rosa Soy, arr. Yankovic) – 3:44
  - Parody of "Rico Suave" by Gerardo; the song documents a narrator's visit to a Mexican restaurant. Cheech Marin does a brief Spanish monologue in the song. From the 1992 album Off the Deep End.
8. "Bedrock Anthem" (orig. Anthony Kiedis, John Frusciante, Flea, Chad Smith, arr. Yankovic) – 3:43
  - Parody of "Under the Bridge" and "Give It Away" by the Red Hot Chili Peppers; the song describes someone who wants to be a Flintstone and live in Bedrock. From the 1993 album Alapalooza.
9. "Harvey the Wonder Hamster" (Yankovic) – 0:21
  - Original; this is a short song about the titular hamster. From the 1993 album Alapalooza.
10. "Achy Breaky Song" (orig. Don Von Tress, arr. Yankovic) – 3:23
  - Parody of "Achy Breaky Heart" by Billy Ray Cyrus; the singer begs to not have to listen to the original song. From the 1993 album Alapalooza.
11. "Livin' in the Fridge" (org. Steven Tyler, Joe Perry, Mark Hudson, arr. Yankovic) – 3:33
  - Parody of "Livin' on the Edge" by Aerosmith; a tune that discusses leftovers that have grown sentient in the refrigerator. From the 1993 album Alapalooza.
12. "Frank's 2000" TV" (Yankovic) – 4:07
  - Style parody of R.E.M.'s early work; a song about consumerism and modern electronics, describing the neighborhood's envy of the eponymous character's new television. From the 1993 album Alapalooza.
13. "Jurassic Park" (orig. Jimmy Webb, arr. Yankovic) – 3:55
  - Parody of "MacArthur Park" by Richard Harris; a spoof that recounts the plot to the movie Jurassic Park. From the 1993 album Alapalooza.
14. "Headline News" (orig. Brad Roberts, arr. Yankovic) - 3:46
  - Parody of "Mmm Mmm Mmm Mmm" by Crash Test Dummies; the song details three major tabloid stories of 1993. This single was recorded for this compilation.

== Credits and personnel ==
Credits are adapted from WeirdAl.com.

=== Band members and production ===
- "Weird Al" Yankovic – synthesizer, piano, accordion, vocals, production
- Jim West – guitar
- Steve Jay – banjo, bass, talking drums
- Jon "Bermuda" Schwartz – percussion, drums
- Richard Bennett – banjo, ukulele, guitar
- Rubén Valtierra – keyboards
- Rick Derringer – guitar, mandolin, production
- Tony Papa – engineer

=== Featured artists ===
- Cheech Marin – vocals on "Taco Grande"
- Mark Knopfler – guitar on "Money for Nothing/Beverly Hillbillies"
- Guy Fletcher – synthesizer on "Money for Nothing/Beverly Hillbillies"
- Alan Reed – voice of Fred Flintstone on "Bedrock Anthem"
- Mel Blanc – voice of Barney Rubble and Dino on "Bedrock Anthem"

=== Other personnel ===
- Warren Luening – trumpet
- Joel Miller – bongos
- Don Pardo – announcer
- Joel Peskin – clarinet
- Lisa Popeil, Petsye Powell, Andrea Robinson, and Pattie Brooks – background vocals
- Pat Regan – synthesizer, piano
- Jim Self – tuba
- Robert Tebow – double bass
- Jimmy "Z" Zavala – saxophone, harmonica
- William K. Anderson – saxophone, harmonica
- Mike Kieffer – percussion
- Dorothy Remsen – harp
- Tress MacNeille – voice of Lucy Ricardo
- Dawn Smithey, Zaidee Cole, and Joan Manners – background vocals
- Gary Herbig – clarinet, saxophone
- Bill Scott – yodeling
- Al Viola – banjo
- The Glove - scratching
- The Waters Sisters – background vocals
- Sonny Burke – piano
- James Cox – guitar synthesizer
- Tommy Johnson – tuba
- John Roarke – voices
- Kim Bullard - synthesizer
- Joe Sublett - saxophone
- Ronny Jay - record scratching
- Nichole Larson - background vocals
- Donny Sierer – saxophone
- The Step Sisters – vocals
- Jim Haas – background vocals
- Jon Joyce – background vocals
- Gene Morford – background vocals
- Carmen Twillie – background vocals
- Jerry Whitman – background vocals
- Sandy Berman – dinosaur sound effects
