= Another One Rides the Bus =

1981 single by "Weird Al" Yankovic

Single by "Weird Al" Yankovic

from the EP Another One Rides the Bus and the album "Weird Al" Yankovic
- B-side: "Gotta Boogie"
- Released: February 1981 (initial release and TK Records re-release); May 3, 1983 (Rock 'n Roll re-release)
- Recorded: September 14, 1980
- Genre: Comedy; parody; polka
- Length: 2:36
- Label: Placebo (initial release); TK (re-release); Rock 'n Roll (1983 re-release)
- Songwriters: John Deacon; "Weird Al" Yankovic (Note: While Yankovic wrote new lyrics for the song, on February 2, 1981, he transferred copyright of the parody to John Deacon. This is reflected in the liner notes for the Another One Rides the Bus EP as well as the 1983 album "Weird Al" Yankovic, both of which list only Deacon as the parody's writer. However, Yankovic is credited with "new lyrics" in the liner notes to Squeeze Box: The Complete Works of "Weird Al" Yankovic (2017).)
- Producer: "Weird Al" Yankovic

"Weird Al" Yankovic singles chronology
"My Bologna" (1979)	"Another One Rides the Bus" (1981)	"Ricky" (1983)

Alternative cover
- Dutch single cover

"Another One Rides the Bus" is a song by comedy musician "Weird Al" Yankovic. It was released in February 1981 and is a parody of Queen's song "Another One Bites the Dust". Yankovic's version describes a person riding in a crowded public bus. It was recorded live on September 14, 1980, on the Dr. Demento Show, hosted by Barret "Dr. Demento" Hansen. Accompanying Yankovic was Jon "Bermuda" Schwartz, who would go on to be the artist's long-time drummer.

The song became a hit on the Dr. Demento Show as well as establishing underground buzz. Hoping to capitalize on the success of the song, Yankovic originally released "Another One Rides the Bus" on an EP of the same name. Later, the song received a wider release, by TK Records, and although it did not crack the Hot 100, it peaked at number 4 on the U.S. Billboard Bubbling Under Hot 100 Singles. However, TK Records soon folded and the song fell off the chart as it received no more promotion from the folded label. The song was later included on Yankovic's 1983 debut album. The song has been well received by critics, and Brian May—the guitarist of Queen—has expressed his amusement with "Another One Rides the Bus".

== Background ==
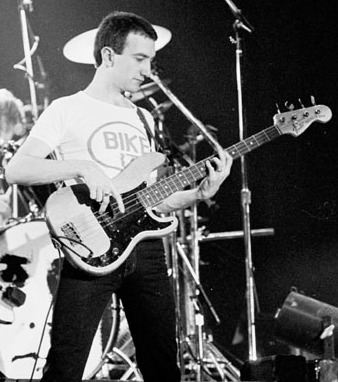
"Another One Bites the Dust", the target of Yankovic's parody, was written by Queen bassist John Deacon.

In 1979, while he was still a student at California Polytechnic State University (Cal Poly) in San Luis Obispo, California, Alfred "Weird Al" Yankovic recorded a rough parody of "My Sharona" by The Knack entitled "My Bologna". Fortuitous circumstances led to the song being released by Capitol Records on December 25, 1979. Although the single managed to sell 10,000 copies a month after its release, Yankovic soon learned that Capitol had no interest in promoting the record or releasing a follow-up single. After graduating in 1980 with a Bachelor of Science degree in architecture, Yankovic still had an interest in releasing parody music, and soon turned his attention to "Another One Bites the Dust" by rock band Queen. The song had been written by Queen bassist John Deacon and released on their 1980 album The Game.

== Writing and recording ==
Lyrically, "Another One Rides the Bus" describes a person riding in a crowded public bus. In the first verse, the bus proceeds to pick up more people. The second verse discusses the various things that are touching the person (such as a suitcase and an elbow), and about how several of his personal items are missing (like a contact lens and a wallet). In the third verse, the speaker is trying to get fresh air but the bus's fan is broken and his window does not open. This causes him to exclaim that he "hasn't been in a crowd like this since [he] went to see The Who." Finally, he laments about not getting off the bus sooner.

Yankovic debuted the song live on September 14, 1980, on the Dr. Demento Show, hosted by Barret "Dr. Demento" Hansen. While practicing the song outside the sound booth, Yankovic met Jon "Bermuda" Schwartz, who offered to provide percussion for his performance. Because Yankovic did not have a drum kit, Schwartz rhythmically struck Yankovic's accordion case as a way of keeping the beat. The version of "Another One Rides the Bus" that was recorded in 1980 and released in 1981 was later re-released in its original form on Yankovic's eponymous debut album (1983).

The single's b-side is "Gotta Boogie", which was co-written by Joe Earley. The song is a play on words discussing a man with a "boogie" on his finger and his failure to get rid of it. The version of "Gotta Boogie" included on this single was recorded in April 1980; this song also appeared on Yankovic's eponymous debut album, although in a re-recorded form.

== Release ==
Much like "My Bologna", "Another One Rides the Bus" was a hit on the Dr. Demento Show, and Dr. Demento himself said:

For the next few weeks we got twice as many requests for "Another One Rides the Bus" as for everything else put together. Thank goodness I had a tape rolling! We even got it in stereo. Over the next couple of months that tape was duplicated and re-duplicated all over the world, as the song took on a life of its own. [...] The Dr. Demento Show gained a couple of dozen new station affiliates just because of that song.

Dr. Demento had recorded Yankovic performing the song during a sound test, becoming the only recording available for Yankovic to use. Eventually, Yankovic borrowed some money from Dr. Demento and pressed one thousand copies of a four-track EP by himself. Yankovic then distributed this EP to various record stores, selling them through consignment deals. Yankovic released the record under Placebo Records, a one-off label founded by Yankovic for the sole purpose of distributing the EPs. Due to the underground success of the EP, Yankovic secured a short-lived record deal with TK Records, which released "Another One Rides the Bus" as a single in February 1981. The record was rush-released, but nevertheless managed to become Yankovic's first Billboard entry, peaking at number four on the Bubbling Under Hot 100 singles chart. However, soon after issuing the "Another One Rides the Bus" single, TK abruptly closed due to financial troubles and the song fell off the charts.

Domestically, the single was released in a generic TK Records sleeve. International versions of the single, however, featured different artwork. The Dutch release, for instance, featured artwork depicting a crowded bus. According to Yankovic's official site, this version of the "single used artwork similar to what would appear on Al's first album."

== Reception ==
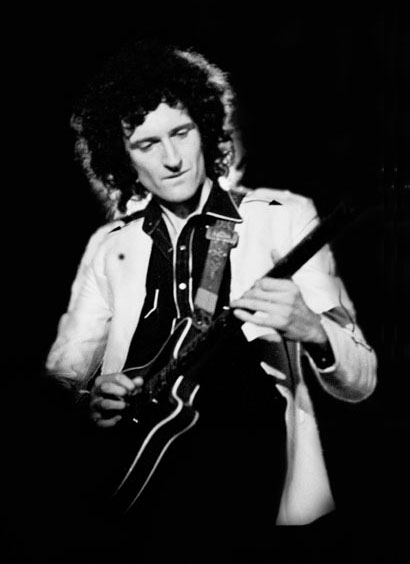
Brian May, the guitarist of Queen, found the song "extremely funny".

The song was well received by music critics. In a later review of Yankovic's debut album, Eugene Chadbourne of AllMusic called the parody "a classic piece of musical humor" that showcased Yankovic's ability to knock "the wind out of any pretentious, overblown rock anthem by slightly adjusting the lyrical content." Nathan Rabin, in the book Weird Al, The Book (2012), praised the song, writing:

Though the modest Yankovic himself laughs off the notion, we can all agree that "Another One Rides the Bus" embodies the anarchic spirit of punk rock just as much as anything Johnny Rotten or The Clash ever recorded. It's the essence of punk: an enraged, defiant malcontent with a long list of grievances screaming his pain to an indifferent world. [...] Yankovic came to symbolize a curiously ubiquitous fixture of new wave: the enraged geek.

Brian May, the guitarist of Queen, found the song amusing, and said in an interview, "There's been a few cover versions [of 'Another One Bites the Dust'] of various kinds, notably 'Another One Rides the Bus', which is an extremely funny record by a bloke called 'Mad Al' or something in the [United] States—it's hilarious."

== Other versions ==
=== Live video ===
Although no official music video was created for this single, Yankovic and Schwartz performed "Another One Rides the Bus" on The Tomorrow Show with Tom Snyder, during Yankovic's first national televised appearance in 1981. During the performance, Yankovic played his accordion and Flexatone and Schwartz banged on Yankovic's accordion case and played bulb horns. The Tomorrow Show performance was later included on the "Weird Al" Yankovic: The Ultimate Video Collection (2003) DVD as a bonus feature.

=== Weird: The Al Yankovic Story and 2022 Rerecording ===
Yankovic would later re-record "Another One Rides the Bus" for the 2022 satirical biopic Weird: The Al Yankovic Story. In the events of the film, during a party hosted by Dr. Demento (Rainn Wilson), Wolfman Jack (Jack Black) and John Deacon (David Dastmalchian) challenge Yankovic (Daniel Radcliffe) to parody "Another One Bites the Dust" on the spot, resulting in Yankovic coming up with the song that amazes the party guests. Initially, Yankovic had originally wanted the scene to feature an actor portraying Freddie Mercury. However, the agreement that Queen had made with Yankovic allowing him to use "Another One Bites the Dust" in the movie prevented from mentioning or showing Freddie Mercury.

=== Use in other media ===
"Another One Rides the Bus" was used in The Walking Dead season eight opener "Mercy" during an ambiguous scene featuring a gray-haired and bearded Rick Grimes joining his family, including young daughter Judith. Many critics and commentators noted that the use of "Another One Rides the Bus" was idiosyncratic. Yankovic later tweeted: "I'm just as confused as you are why 'Another One Rides the Bus' was featured in #TheWalkingDead season premiere, but I'm extremely honored!" Showrunner Scott M. Gimple later told Entertainment Weekly that he had chosen the track because it "had to be a song that I wanted Judith to be into". Gimple also claimed that he wanted the music to be "even more jarring" than Rick's appearance.

== Track listing ==
1. "Another One Rides the Bus" – 2:36
2. "Gotta Boogie" – 2:21

== Personnel ==
Credits from the liner notes of The Essential "Weird Al" Yankovic:

- "Weird Al" Yankovic – lead vocal and accordion
- Jon "Bermuda" Schwartz – accordion case percussion
- Damaskas – backing vocal
- "Musical Mike" Kieffer & Sulu – musical hands
- Beefalo Bill, Tohm & Jeri – misc. insanities

== Chart positions ==
Chart (1981)	Peak Position
U.S. Billboard Bubbling Under Hot 100 Singles	4

== See also ==
- List of singles by "Weird Al" Yankovic
- List of songs by "Weird Al" Yankovic

== Bibliography ==
- Rabin, Nathan; Yankovic, Alfred M. (September 25, 2012). Weird Al: The Book. Abrams Image. ISBN 9781419704352.
- Purvis, Georg (March 13, 2012). Queen: The Complete Works (e-book). Titan Books. ISBN 9780857685513.
