= Ricky ("Weird Al" Yankovic song) =

1983 single by "Weird Al" Yankovic

Single by "Weird Al" Yankovic featuring Tress MacNeille

from the album "Weird Al" Yankovic
- B-side: "Buckingham Blues"
- Released: May 3, 1983
- Recorded: February 11, 1983
- Genre: Comedy; parody
- Length: 2:35
- Label: Scotti Brothers
- Songwriter(s): Mike Chapman; Nicky Chinn; "Weird Al" Yankovic
- Producer(s): Rick Derringer

"Weird Al" Yankovic singles chronology
"Another One Rides the Bus" (1981)	"Ricky" (1983)	"I Love Rocky Road" (1983)

"Weird Al" Yankovic track listing
- 1. "Ricky"; 2. "Gotta Boogie"; 3. "I Love Rocky Road"; 4. "Buckingham Blues"; 5. "Happy Birthday"; 6. "Stop Draggin' My Car Around"; 7. "My Bologna"; 8. "The Check's in the Mail"; 9. "Another One Rides the Bus"; 10. "I'll Be Mellow When I'm Dead"; 11. "Such a Groovy Guy"; 12. "Mr. Frump in the Iron Lung"

Music video
- "Ricky" on YouTube

"Ricky" is a 1983 song by American parody artist "Weird Al" Yankovic, duetting with voice actress Tress MacNeille. It is a parody of the 1982 song "Mickey" by Toni Basil, which itself is a cover of Mike Chapman and Nicky Chinn's "Kitty" recorded by Racey. The song focuses on Lucy and Ricky Ricardo in 1950's sitcom I Love Lucy, and their general discussions and hobbies within the show. "Ricky" was one of the last two tracks added to "Weird Al" Yankovic, in order to fill out the length for an LP record, and was recorded at Scotti Brothers Records.

The music video was created for the song was Yankovic's first, and also, by far, the least expensive to film. According to the liner notes in the compilation DVD "Weird Al" Yankovic: The Ultimate Video Collection, "it was arguably the first comedy video ever shown on MTV", and according to the liner notes in Permanent Record: Al in the Box, the introduction to comedy in the "infancy of MTV" let Dr Demento see "the potential for this new medium."

According to Yankovic, Lucille Ball had written him a signed letter expressing her love and appreciation for the parody.

== Track listing ==
1. "Ricky" – 2:35
2. "Buckingham Blues" – 3:11

== Music video ==
The music video for "Ricky", directed by Janet Greek, was filmed majorly in black and white to resemble the television sitcom I Love Lucy. Yankovic plays the role of Ricky Ricardo, originally played by Desi Arnaz in the television show, complete with an affected Cuban accent. To more closely resemble the character, Yankovic appears without his iconic look of glasses, moustache or long curly hair. He is also seen briefly in several scenes as himself with his band, playing the accordion and appearing in his normal moustache and curly hair, temporarily using a Double for Ricky. Scenes with his traditional appearance were filmed initially, and then removed his moustache for the scenes following. Tress MacNeille plays the role of Lucy, giving an impression of Lucille Ball's somewhat raspy voice and her typical mannerisms such as her unique way of crying.

Near the end of the video, a cheerleader can be seen dancing in the crowd. This is a direct reference to the music video for "Mickey".

The video (and song) ends with a segment of the I Love Lucy theme played on guitar rounding out with Ricky on accordion, followed by Ricky doing his trademark "Huah! Huah! Huah!" laugh. Dr. Demento makes a cameo appearance at the very end, wearing a top-hat and beard, dancing.

== Personnel ==
According to the liner notes of the 3.0 version of The Essential "Weird Al" Yankovic:

- "Weird Al" Yankovic – lead vocal, accordion
- Tress MacNeille – voice of Lucy
- Rick Derringer – guitar
- Steve Jay – bass guitar
- Jon "Bermuda" Schwartz – drums
- Joel Miller – bongos
- Dorothy Remsen – harp

== Chart positions ==
Chart (1983)	Peak Position	Peak Date
U.S. Billboard Hot 100	63	May 28, 1983
U.S. Cashbox Top 100	58	June 4, 1983

== See also ==
- List of singles by "Weird Al" Yankovic
- List of songs by "Weird Al" Yankovic
- "Weird Al" Yankovic discography
