= My Bologna =

1979 single by "Weird Al" Yankovic

Single by "Weird Al" Yankovic

from the album "Weird Al" Yankovic
- B-side: "School Cafeteria"
- Released: December 25, 1979; May 3, 1983
- Recorded: September 1979; March 14, 1982 (1983 release)
- Genre: Comedy; comedy rock
- Length: 2:20 (single version); 2:03 (album version)
- Label: Capitol (single); Rock 'n Roll (album re-release)
- Songwriters: Doug Fieger; Berton Averre; "Weird Al" Yankovic
- Producers: "Weird Al" Yankovic (1979 recording); Rick Derringer (1983 recording)

"Weird Al" Yankovic singles chronology
"My Bologna" (1979)	"Another One Rides the Bus" (1981)

"My Bologna" is the debut single by American musical parody artist "Weird Al" Yankovic, originally released in December 1979. It is a parody of the Knack's hit song "My Sharona". Yankovic originally wrote the lyrics while he attended California Polytechnic State University in San Luis Obispo, California; the original version of the parody was recorded in a bathroom across the hall from the campus radio station, KCPR, at which Yankovic had worked as a DJ. The title refers to Bologna sausage, specifically the Oscar Mayer brand popular in the United States. Yankovic sent "My Bologna" to Dr. Demento, who aired the song on his nationwide radio program, The Dr. Demento Show. The song was a hit on the program, and eventually gained the number one spot on Dr. Demento's "Funny Five" countdown.

After a fortuitous encounter with Doug Fieger (the lead singer of the Knack), and Rupert Perry (then-vice president of Capitol Records), Capitol Records decided to release it as a single. Yankovic was paid $500 for the master tape of the song, and its B-side, "School Cafeteria". A month after its commercial release, the single sold 10,000 copies. The song also received positive—albeit limited—reviews from media outlets. Although a music video was never produced for the song, an "unofficial" video was filmed, featuring a young Yankovic lip-syncing to this song at Cuesta College in December 1979. "My Bologna" was later re-recorded and released on Yankovic's debut album (1983), and the "bathroom version" was re-released on the box sets Permanent Record: Al in the Box (1994) and Squeeze Box: The Complete Works of "Weird Al" Yankovic (2017).

== Background and recording ==
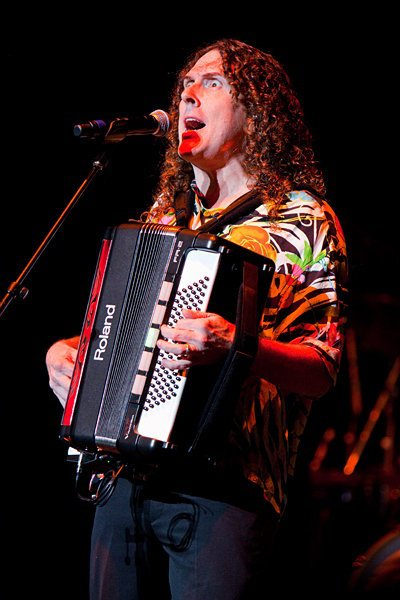
The song was written by Alfred "Weird Al" Yankovic in 1979, when he was a student at California Polytechnic State University (Cal Poly) in San Luis Obispo, California.

In the late 1970s, Alfred "Weird Al" Yankovic, was a student at California Polytechnic State University (Cal Poly) in San Luis Obispo, California, and in his spare time, he was a DJ for the university's radio station, KCPR. Yankovic had a penchant for comedy music and often played it on his radio show. In mid-1979, the song "My Sharona" by the Knack was receiving heavy airplay on the radio, and Yankovic started to consider spoofing the single. This parody eventually came to fruition during an ad hoc jam session with his friend Jon Iverson; while Iverson played the main riff to "My Sharona" on his guitar, Yankovic began to write lyrics for his parody. Yankovic's lyrics eventually coalesced into "My Bologna", an ode to the Oscar Mayer brand of Bologna sausage. The duo started to play it in and around the Cal Poly campus at parties and local theaters.

In September 1979, Yankovic decided to record his parody in the men's bathroom across from the KCPR offices, because the tiled room made "an acoustically perfect studio." Taped using musical equipment from the radio station, the original version of "My Bologna" featured only Yankovic's vocals accompanied by his accordion. Yankovic then sent his recording to Barret "Dr. Demento" Hansen, a radio personality who hosted the syndicated Dr. Demento Show, which showcased comedy and oddball music. According to Dr. Demento himself, "The response I got when I played ['My Bologna'] on the air dwarfed not only that for all [Yankovic's] earlier tapes, but practically everything else I played that whole year."

== Release ==
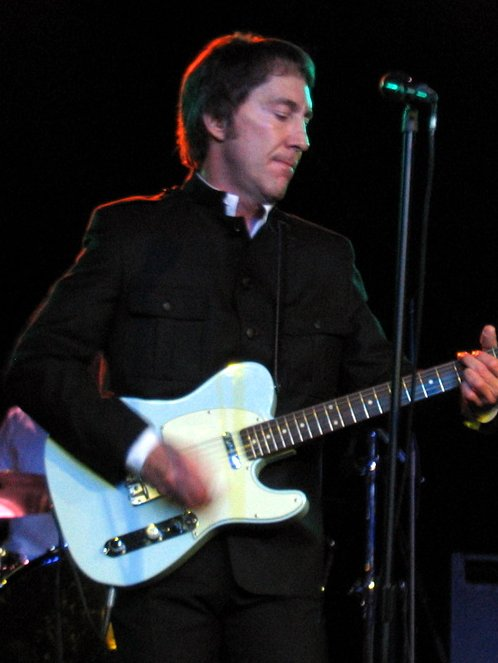
Doug Fieger of the Knack enjoyed the parody and was instrumental in convincing Capitol Records to release it as a single.

On September 27, 1979, Yankovic received a type-written note from Dr. Demento informing him that "My Bologna" was a smash hit on his radio show, and that Capitol Records had contacted the station, requesting a copy of the spoof for the Knack themselves. Later, the Knack performed at Cal Poly, and Yankovic approached the band and Rupert Perry (then-vice president of Capitol Records) backstage. He informed them of who he was, and, according to Yankovic, "[the Knack lead singer] Doug Fieger [...] said 'Oh, ['My Bologna' is] a really a great song!' and then he turned to Rupert Perry and said 'You guys oughta put this song out on Capitol Records' and Rupert said 'OK, let's do it!'" Yankovic was paid $500 for the song's master, as well as the master for the soon-to-be b-side track "School Cafeteria". The "My Bologna" single was released on Christmas Day, 1979 (a month after the Knack's concert at Cal Poly) and Yankovic was given a six-month contract.

On March 14, 1982, Yankovic re-recorded the song for his debut album, "Weird Al" Yankovic. He later joked that this was done because "somehow, we thought [the song] might sound better recorded in a professional 24-track studio than [it] did when [it was] recorded in a bathroom". The Capitol Records single version also appears on Permanent Record: Al in the Box (1994) (Note: Original pressings of the Permanent Record: Al in the Box box set, however, included the album version by mistake.) and Squeeze Box: The Complete Works of "Weird Al" Yankovic (2017). "School Cafeteria" was never re-recorded or made available on any studio albums, although a live-on-the-radio version was released on the compilation album Dr. Demento's Basement Tapes 7.

== Reception ==
Prior to the single's commercial release, the song was a hit on the Dr. Demento Show, and landed at number one on the radio show's "Funny Five" countdown chart. Within a month of the single being released by Capitol, it had sold 10,000 copies. However, Yankovic soon learned that Capitol Records had no interest in promoting the single.

The first industry mention of the single came from Variety; in an article, the magazine erroneously listed the song's creator as "Wendell Yankovich" and noted that "the tune—not too seriously, folks—is called 'My Bologna', based on you-know-what." In a later review of Yankovic's debut album, Eugene Chadbourne of AllMusic praised the re-recorded version of the song, writing: "'My Bologna' demonstrated the [...] fine art of making the stupid much stupider. A later album title by this artist would be Dare to Be Stupid, and if the Knack's 'My Sharona' had to be sacrificed at his creative altar for this to be understood, so be it."

== Music video ==
Although an official video was never released, an "unofficial" video was filmed, featuring a young Yankovic lip-syncing to this song at Cuesta College in December 1979, as part of a final project for a TV production class for a Cal Poly, KCPR classmate, Randy Kerdoon. Yankovic—who later referred to the video as "absolutely terrible, yet of earth-shatteringly profound historical significance"—credits Kerdoon for producing and directing his first music video. This unofficial music video is included on the DVD "Weird Al" Yankovic: The Ultimate Video Collection (2003) as an Easter egg.

== Legacy ==
Yankovic's 2022 comedy biographical film Weird: the Al Yankovic Story satirically claims that Yankovic was inspired to pen "My Bologna" after he heard "My Sharona" on the radio while he was making bologna sandwiches. A 2022 re-recording of the song was also included as part of the movie's soundtrack.

== Track listing ==
A-side
No.	Title	Writer(s)	Length
1.	"My Bologna"	Doug Fieger, Berton Averre, "Weird Al" Yankovic	2:20

B-side
No.	Title	Writer(s)	Length
1.	"School Cafeteria"	Yankovic	2:12
Total length:			4:32

== Personnel ==
- “Weird Al” Yankovic – accordion, lead and backing vocals
- Jim West – guitar
- Steve Jay – bass
- Jon “Bermuda” Schwartz – drums

== See also ==
- "Weird Al" Yankovic discography
- List of songs recorded by "Weird Al" Yankovic
