= "Weird Al" Yankovic (album) =

1983 album by "Weird Al" Yankovic

Studio album by "Weird Al" Yankovic
- Released: May 3, 1983
- Recorded: September 14, 1980 – February 11, 1983
- Studios: Cherokee (Hollywood); Santa Monica Sound Recorders (Santa Monica); KMET (Los Angeles)
- Genre: Comedy
- Length: 32:59
- Labels: Rock 'n Roll; Scotti Brothers
- Producer: Rick Derringer

"Weird Al" Yankovic chronology
Another One Rides the Bus (1981)	"Weird Al" Yankovic (1983)	"Weird Al" Yankovic in 3-D (1984)

Singles from "Weird Al" Yankovic
- 1. "Another One Rides the Bus" Released: February 1981; 2. "Ricky" Released: May 3, 1983; 3. "I Love Rocky Road" Released: July 5, 1983

"Weird Al" Yankovic is the debut studio album by the American parody musician "Weird Al" Yankovic. The album was the first of many produced by former the McCoys guitarist Rick Derringer. Mostly recorded in March 1982, the album was released by Rock 'n Roll Records as an LP and on Compact Cassette in May 1983.

Consisting of five direct parodies and seven original songs, "Weird Al" Yankovic parodies pop and rock music of the late 1970s and early 1980s, and satirizes American culture and experiences of the same time period. Nearly half of the album is made up of parodies based on the works of Toni Basil, the Arrows, Stevie Nicks, the Knack and Queen. Yankovic's trademark instrument—the accordion—is used on all songs featured on the album.

Fueled by the underground success of the singles "My Bologna" and "Another One Rides the Bus", the album charted at No. 139 on the Billboard 200. Critically, the album received a lukewarm reception, with many reviewers feeling that Yankovic was a throw-away act who would not be able to overcome the stigma of a novelty record. Retrospective assessments have been slightly more favorable, though have still unfavorably compared it to Yankovic's subsequent work.

== Production ==
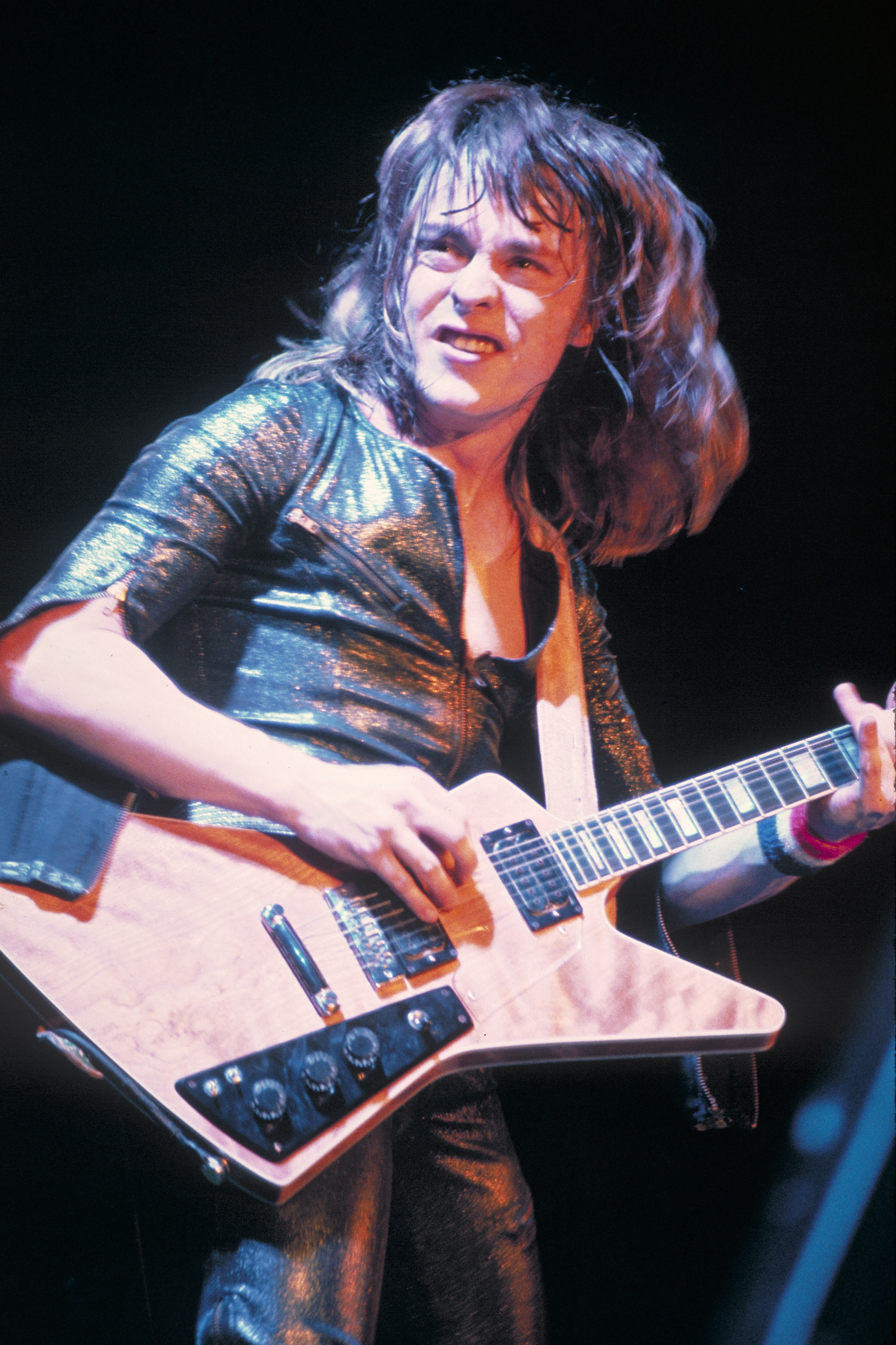
"Ace rock guitarist" Rick Derringer (pictured in 1974) produced "Weird Al" Yankovic.

After hearing Yankovic's parody of his song "I Love Rock 'n' Roll" entitled "I Love Rocky Road", songwriter Jake Hooker suggested to guitarist Rick Derringer that he would be the perfect producer for the burgeoning parodist. Despite being a rock musician, Derringer had been raised in a family that enjoyed novelty music, and so he agreed to work with Yankovic. Using his music industry prestige, Derringer convinced Cherokee Studios to record an album's worth of Yankovic's songs gratis, to be paid from future sales revenue.

In March 1982, "Weird Al" Yankovic stepped into a professional recording studio for the first time and recorded nine of the songs for "Weird Al" Yankovic.

The huge irony of my life; [...] it was difficult for me to get signed to a record deal back in early 80s because all the executives were saying "Oh, you do that ... novelty music. You're gonna have maybe one hit if you're lucky and then [...] you'll go right to oblivion. You know, nobody'll ever hear from you again."

— "Weird Al" Yankovic, speaking with Bob Boilen on All Songs Considered in 2006

After encountering difficulty picking up a record label for the first-time album, Jay Levey (a Los Angeles artists' manager) provided KIQQ-FM with a copy of "I Love Rocky Road". Impressing the program director of the Top 40 station, he played it immediately; "I Love Rocky Road" was one of the most-requested songs by the next day. At the same time, Rock 'n Roll Records president Tad Dowd had been trying to convince parent company Scotti Brothers Records to sign the 22-year-old Yankovic. The positive furor over the KIQQ playtest provided Dowd with the leverage needed to convince Scotti Bros. to offer a contract for Yankovic's first album. When Derringer learned that the label had made Yankovic an offer, he told the parodist that while the label's contract was not the must lucrative, Scotti Bros. had a strong reputation for record promotion and a release on the label would likely be a hit.

Scotti Brothers Records' contract planned an April 1983 release date for a twelve-track album: "I Love Rocky Road" and eight other tracks were already recorded, "Another One Rides the Bus" would be the original 1980 live recording from The Dr. Demento Show, and the last two songs ("Ricky" and "Buckingham Blues") would be recorded at Scotti Brothers' own studios in Santa Monica, California in February 1983.

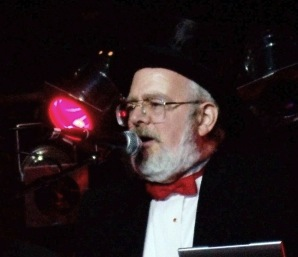
Dr. Demento helped promote "Weird Al" Yankovic. (August 15, 2004, David Rossi)

To promote the album, Levey coordinated a three-week tour in late Summer 1983 across the United States' East Coast and Midwest for both Yankovic and Dr. Demento. Promoted as ""An Evening of Dementia with Dr. Demento in Person Plus 'Weird Al' Yankovic", Demento opened with recorded hits and short comedy films from his show before introducing Yankovic and the band. During their three weeks, the tour played in several famous clubs, including The Bottom Line in New York City.

The album cover for "Weird Al" Yankovic was designed by Brazilian artist Rogerio. The band chose Rogerio because of his "Mad magazine-like drawing style." The cover art specifically features individual elements that correspond with each of the album's twelve songs.

== Composition ==
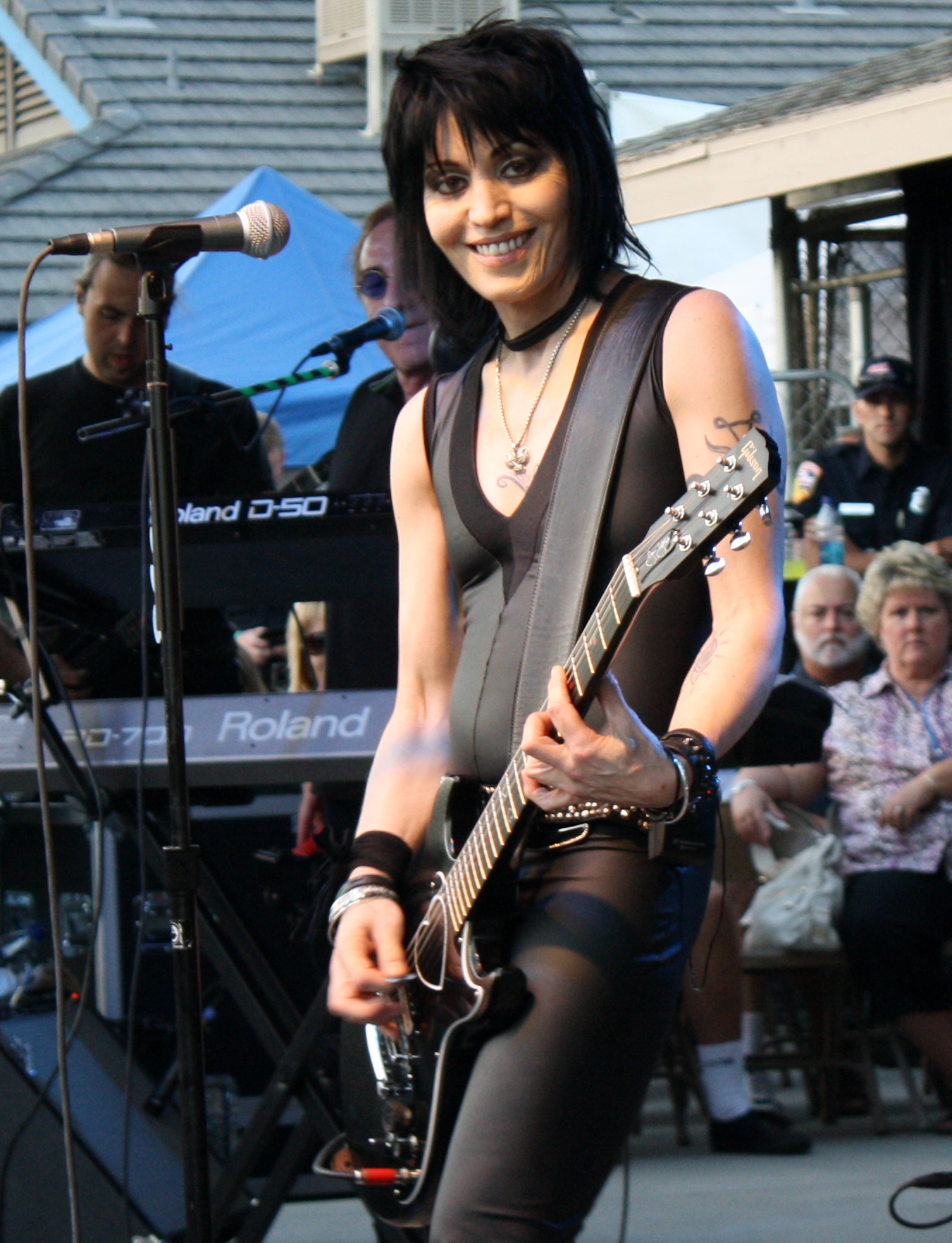
Joan Jett & The Blackhearts' version of "I Love Rock 'n' Roll" is parodied on the album.

"Weird Al" Yankovic is the only album in Yankovic's discography to use the accordion in every song; in subsequent albums it is only used where deemed appropriate or wholly inappropriate for comedic effect. "Ricky" is a parody of "Mickey" by Toni Basil; an ode to I Love Lucy with Yankovic performing as Ricky and Tress MacNeille as Lucy. "Gotta Boogie" is a play on words discussing a man with a "boogie" on his finger and his quandary therein. "I Love Rocky Road" is a parody of Arrows' "I Love Rock 'n' Roll" made famous by Joan Jett; in the song the narrator expresses feelings about the titular ice cream flavor. "Buckingham Blues" is a blues song satirizing the socialite lifestyle of the Prince and Princess of Wales (Prince Charles and Diana). Originally, the song was going to be a parody of "Jack & Diane" by John Mellencamp; worried about spoiling a Jack and Diane movie deal, Mellencamp shot down the parody. Yankovic considered tweaking the "Jack & Diane" melody to avoid the song being a true parody, but decided against it and later rewrote it as an original song. Answering a fan in 1998, Yankovic replied that he would not rewrite and rerecord the song in light of the death of Diana. He would later perform a parody of "Jack & Diane" titled "Homer and Marge" for a 2003 episode of The Simpsons called "Three Gays of the Condo".

"Happy Birthday" is a style parody of Tonio K, one of Yankovic's favorite artists. The song is a morbidly depressing birthday song detailing ails of the world, including poverty, nuclear holocaust, and eventual solar cataclysm. Only seeing two popular birthday songs at the time—"Happy Birthday to You" by Patty and Mildred J. Hill, and "Birthday" by the Beatles—Yankovic decided to write his own "severely twisted version of one." "Stop Draggin' My Car Around" is a parody of "Stop Draggin' My Heart Around" by Stevie Nicks; the lament of an otherwise "cool guy" forced to repeatedly save his 1964 Plymouth car from impoundment due to illegal parking, shame, and non-payment. "My Bologna" is a parody of "My Sharona" by the Knack; the narrator talks about his obsession with bologna sausage. This is a re-recording of the song; the original Capitol Records single version would not appear on a "Weird Al" album until the 1994 box set Permanent Record: Al in the Box. "The Check's in the Mail" parodies business-related prevarications, exampling avoidance, litigation, and the titular payment delay. "Another One Rides the Bus" is a parody of "Another One Bites the Dust" by Queen; the narrator laments about a crowded public bus. This is the original 1980 recording from The Dr. Demento Show. "I'll Be Mellow When I'm Dead" is a rejection of the stereotypical attitudes and accoutrements of the hippie/yuppie lifestyles.

"Such a Groovy Guy" parodies narcissism specifically noting fashion, demeanor, dominance and submission, and relationship breakup. Yankovic wrote the song for a woman he was dating in homage of her previous boyfriend who, upon the breakup asked her, "I'm such a groovy guy! Why would you break up with me?" Out of concern the individual may not be aware of his status, Yankovic does not identify him. "Mr. Frump in the Iron Lung" is an audience favorite from Yankovic's days playing in coffeehouses at Cal Poly; the song describes the rather lopsided relationship between the narrator and the eponymous "Mr. Frump" in his iron lung, until the latter's death. The sound of the iron lung is an accordion's air release valve. "It's Still Billy Joel to Me", Yankovic's 1980 parody of Billy Joel's "It's Still Rock and Roll to Me", was originally planned for this album. Wary of the song being considered "dated" three years later, and doubtful that Joel would give his blessing, the band never bothered to ask. "Yoda", Yankovic's parody of the Kinks' song "Lola", was written in 1980 (during the initial theatre run of The Empire Strikes Back) and was a "huge hit" on The Dr. Demento Show. However, the complexities of receiving permission from filmmaker George Lucas and the Kinks' publishers delayed its release until 1985.

== Promotion and tour ==
To promote the album, the songs "Ricky" and "I Love Rocky Road" were released as singles with accompanying music videos. Yankovic embarked on his first official concert tour, officially named An Evening of Dementia with Dr. Demento in Person Plus "Weird Al" Yankovic, which began at the Bottom Line in New York City on May 21, 1983 and ended June 10, 1983 at Mickey's in Milwaukee.

An Evening of Dementia with Dr. Demento in Person Plus "Weird Al" Yankovic List of 1983 concerts
Date	City	Country	Venue
May 21	New York City	United States	The Bottom Line
May 22	Roslyn	United States	My Father's Place
May 24	New Haven	United States	Toad's Place
May 26	Boston	United States	Jonathan Swift's
May 28	Syracuse	United States	Lost Horizon
May 31	Rochester	United States	Red Creek
June 1	Buffalo	United States	Tralfamadore
June 3	Toronto	Canada	El Mocambo
June 8	Cleveland	United States	Agora Ballroom
June 9	Chicago	United States	Park West
June 10	Milwaukee	United States	Mickey's

== Critical reception ==
Professional ratings
Review scores
Source	Rating
AllMusic	3.5/5 stars
The Daily Vault	B−
Pitchfork	8.2/10
Rolling Stone	3/5 stars

Eugene Chadbourne, reviewer for AllMusic, felt that while "Weird Al" Yankovic was a detailed harbinger of parody to come, the album does not hold up well on its own. Chadbourne extolled most of the parodies ("Another One Rides the Bus", "My Bologna", "I Love Rocky Road") for their comedic value in contrast with their originals. However, also according to Chadbourne, "Ricky" lacks the comedic connection Yankovic cultivates in later albums, and the original songs "may not seem like they were written in ten minutes, but the ideas behind them don't seem to involve that much contemplation. [They're] like little bits of puff [whose ...] impact on the flow of an album side is more like ballast."

Introducing Yankovic as the guest DJ for All Songs Considered on National Public Radio in 2006, host Bob Boilen opined that upon his debut, Yankovic "seemed the epitome of a throw-away novelty act". Reviewing Yankovic in 2008, Brian Raftery of Wired magazine wrote that "Ricky" introduced the world to "an accordion-playing spaz with a coif like Rick James and a voice like an urgent goose." Raftery noted that in 1983, Yankovic was considered a fad of the time—"like parachute pants and Contras"—and "thoroughly disposable." Musical databasing and review websites AllMusic and Artistdirect rated "Weird Al" Yankovic three and a half out of five stars.

== Track listing ==
Side one
No.	Title	Writer(s)	Parody of	Length
1.	"Ricky"	Mike Chapman, Nicky Chinn, "Weird Al" Yankovic	"Mickey" by Toni Basil	2:36
2.	"Gotta Boogie"	Yankovic	Original	2:14
3.	"I Love Rocky Road"	Alan Merrill, Jake Hooker, Yankovic	"I Love Rock 'n' Roll" by Joan Jett & the Blackhearts	2:36
4.	"Buckingham Blues"	Yankovic	Original	3:13
5.	"Happy Birthday"	Yankovic	Style parody of Tonio K	2:28
6.	"Stop Draggin' My Car Around"	Tom Petty, Mike Campbell, Yankovic	"Stop Draggin' My Heart Around" by Stevie Nicks & Tom Petty and the Heartbreakers	3:16

Side two
No.	Title	Writer(s)	Parody of	Length
7.	"My Bologna"	Doug Fieger, Berton Averre, Yankovic	"My Sharona" by the Knack	2:01
8.	"The Check's in the Mail"	Yankovic	Original	3:13
9.	"Another One Rides the Bus"	John Deacon, Yankovic (Note: While Yankovic wrote new lyrics for the song, on February 2, 1981, he transferred copyright of the parody to John Deacon. This is reflected in the liner notes for the album itself, which lists only Deacon as the parody's writer.)	"Another One Bites the Dust" by Queen	2:40
10.	"I'll Be Mellow When I'm Dead"	Yankovic	Original	3:39
11.	"Such a Groovy Guy"	Yankovic	Original	3:02
12.	"Mr. Frump in the Iron Lung"	Yankovic	Original	1:54
Total length:				32:59

== Personnel ==
Credits adapted from LP liner notes, except where noted.

Musicians

- "Weird Al" Yankovic – accordion, lead vocals, backing vocals
- Rick Derringer - guitars, backing vocals
- Steve Jay – bass guitar, backing vocals
- Jon "Bermuda" Schwartz – drums, percussion, backing vocals
- Richard Bennett – banjo, ukulele; guitar solo on "I'll Be Mellow When I'm Dead"; additional guitar (Note: The credits on "Weird Al" Yankovic give special thanks to Jim West. West was playing guitar with Yankovic and the band at live performances, but was not present for recording the album. Most of the guitar playing on the album was done by producer Rick Derringer, but Jon Schwartz's brother, Richard Bennett, contributes additional guitar as well as banjo and ukulele.)
- William K. Anderson – saxophone, harmonica
- Joel Miller – bongos
- "Musical Mike" Kieffer – musical hands
- Dorothy Remsen – harp
- Tress MacNeille – voice of Lucy on "Ricky"
- Dawn Smithey – female backing vocals
- Zaidee Cole – female backing vocals
- Joan Manners – female backing vocals
- Jay Levey – male backing vocals
- Damaskas (Dan Hollombe) – male backing vocals
- Jake (Jake Hooker) – male backing vocals
- The Doctor (Dr. Demento) – male backing vocals

Technical

- Rick Derringer – producer
- Tony Papa – engineer (tracks 1, 4)
- Peter Kelsey – engineer (tracks 2–3, 5–12)
- Ted Jensen – mastering

== Charts and certifications ==
=== Charts ===
Chart (1984)	Peak position
US Billboard 200	139

=== Certifications ===
Country	Certification (sales thresholds)
United States	Gold

=== Singles ===
Year	Song	Peak position
Year	Song	US 100
1981	"Another One Rides the Bus"	104
1983	"Ricky"	63
1983	"I Love Rocky Road"	106
