= "Weird Al" Yankovic in 3-D =

1984 album by "Weird Al" Yankovic

Studio album by "Weird Al" Yankovic
- Released: February 28, 1984
- Recorded: October 1–December 13, 1983
- Studios: Santa Monica Sound Recorders, Santa Monica
- Genres: Comedy; parody
- Length: 44:03
- Labels: Rock n' Roll; Scotti Brothers
- Producer: Rick Derringer

"Weird Al" Yankovic chronology
"Weird Al" Yankovic (1983)	"Weird Al" Yankovic in 3-D (1984)	Dare to Be Stupid (1985)

Singles from In 3-D
- 1. "Eat It" Released: February 28, 1984; 2. "King of Suede" Released: April 1984; 3. "I Lost on Jeopardy" Released: June 4, 1984

"Weird Al" Yankovic in 3-D (often referred to simply as In 3-D) is the second studio album by the American parody musician "Weird Al" Yankovic, released on February 28, 1984, by Rock 'n Roll Records. The album was one of many produced by former McCoys guitarist Rick Derringer. Recorded between October and December 1983, the album was Yankovic's follow-up to his modestly successful debut LP, "Weird Al" Yankovic.

The album is built around parodies and pastiches of pop and rock music of the mid-1980s. Half of the album is made up of parodies of artists like Michael Jackson, Men Without Hats, the Greg Kihn Band, the Police, and Survivor. The other half of the album contains many "style parodies", musical imitations that come close to but do not directly copy a specific work by existing artists. These style parodies include imitations of artists such as Bob Marley and the B-52s. This album marked a musical departure from Yankovic's self-titled debut, in that the arrangements of the parodies were now closer to the originals. Also, the accordion was no longer used in every song, but only where deemed appropriate or comically inappropriate. The album is also notable for being the first album released by Yankovic to include a polka medley of hit songs. A similar pastiche of hit songs, set to polka music, has since appeared on nearly all of Yankovic's albums.

"Weird Al" Yankovic in 3-D was met with mostly positive reviews and peaked at number seventeen on the Billboard 200 and number sixty-one in Australia. The album also produced one of Yankovic's most famous singles, "Eat It" (a parody of Michael Jackson's "Beat It"), which peaked at number twelve on the Billboard Hot 100. This song was Yankovic's highest-charting single until "White & Nerdy" from his 2006 album Straight Outta Lynwood peaked at number nine in the October 21, 2006 Billboard charts. "Eat It" also charted at number one in Australia, making it Yankovic's only number one single in any country. The album also produced two minor US hits, "King of Suede", which peaked at number sixty-two, and "I Lost on Jeopardy", which peaked at number eighty-one. The album was Yankovic's first Gold record, and went on to be certified Platinum for sales of over one million copies in the United States. "Eat It" won a Grammy Award for Best Comedy Performance Single or Album, Spoken or Musical in 1985.

== Production ==
=== Recording ===
In October 1983, Yankovic began recording his second album at Santa Monica Sound Recorders, in Santa Monica, California. To produce it, he brought in former McCoys guitarist Rick Derringer, who also produced Yankovic's first album. Backing Yankovic were Jon "Bermuda" Schwartz on drums, Steve Jay on bass, and Jim West on guitar. During the first recording session for the album, five original songs were recorded: "Nature Trail to Hell", "Mr. Popeil", "Buy Me a Condo", "Midnight Star", and "That Boy Could Dance". Two months later, Yankovic began recording the five parodies and polka medley that would appear on the album: "Eat It", "King of Suede", "I Lost on Jeopardy", "Theme from Rocky XIII (The Rye or the Kaiser)", "The Brady Bunch", and "Polkas on 45".

Every song on Yankovic's debut album was played on an accordion, accompanied by bass, guitar, and drums. On In 3-D, Yankovic decided to restrict the accordion to certain sections, most notably the polka medley "Polkas on 45". In the "Ask Al" section of his web site, Yankovic explained: "Nowadays, I only use it on original songs where I feel an accordion is appropriate, and on parody songs where I feel an accordion is [comically] inappropriate ... and of course, on the polka medleys. I'm not really downplaying the accordion at all – I usually feature the accordion on three or four songs every album, which is three or four more accordion-based songs than most Top 40 albums have!"

"It's kind of a backlash from the first album, where we had accordion on everything. It just became a little overwhelming to me. For a while I was relegating the accordion to just the polka medleys. I'm probably going to be using a bit more accordion in the future; I get letters from people saying they miss the accordion on the records."

— "Weird Al" Yankovic, speaking about the lack of accordion on In 3-D

=== Originals ===
One of the first originals recorded for the album was "Midnight Star", a loving ode to fictional supermarket tabloids. The liner notes to Permanent Record state that a Weekly World News article about the "Incredible Frog Boy" helped to inspire the song. According to Yankovic, most of the headlines were taken from actual tabloids, which he spent several weeks collecting and looking through to find. Initially, he thought that "Midnight Star" should have been the lead single for the album, but later relented and released "Eat It" instead. "Buy Me a Condo" is a style parody of Bob Marley and the reggae genre in general.

"Mr. Popeil" is a song discussing the inventor Sam Popeil (the father of inventor Ron Popeil) and his myriad inventions of varying usefulness. Musically, it is a style parody of the B-52s, which Robert Christgau wrote "exploits Yankovic's otherwise fatal resemblance to Fred Schneider." One of the backing vocalists on the track is Ron Popeil's sister, Lisa Popeil. When recording the song, Yankovic came across an article about Lisa Popeil and her singing career and later asked her if she would be interested in appearing in the song, to which she agreed.

The last original song to be recorded for the album was "Nature Trail to Hell", about a fictional slasher film "in 3-D"; 3D film had enjoyed a brief resurgence in 1981–83, with the likes of Parasite, Friday the 13th Part III and Amityville 3-D being successful 3-D horrors. At the 3:40 mark, the song has a backward message that says "Satan eats Cheez Whiz!" This, in turn, was a parody of the Satanic backmasking scare during the early 1980s. Online magazine Pitchfork Media has alluded to the song several times, once comparing it to "Thrill Kill" by the Damned, and another time sarcastically calling the song a "classic".

=== Parodies and polka ===
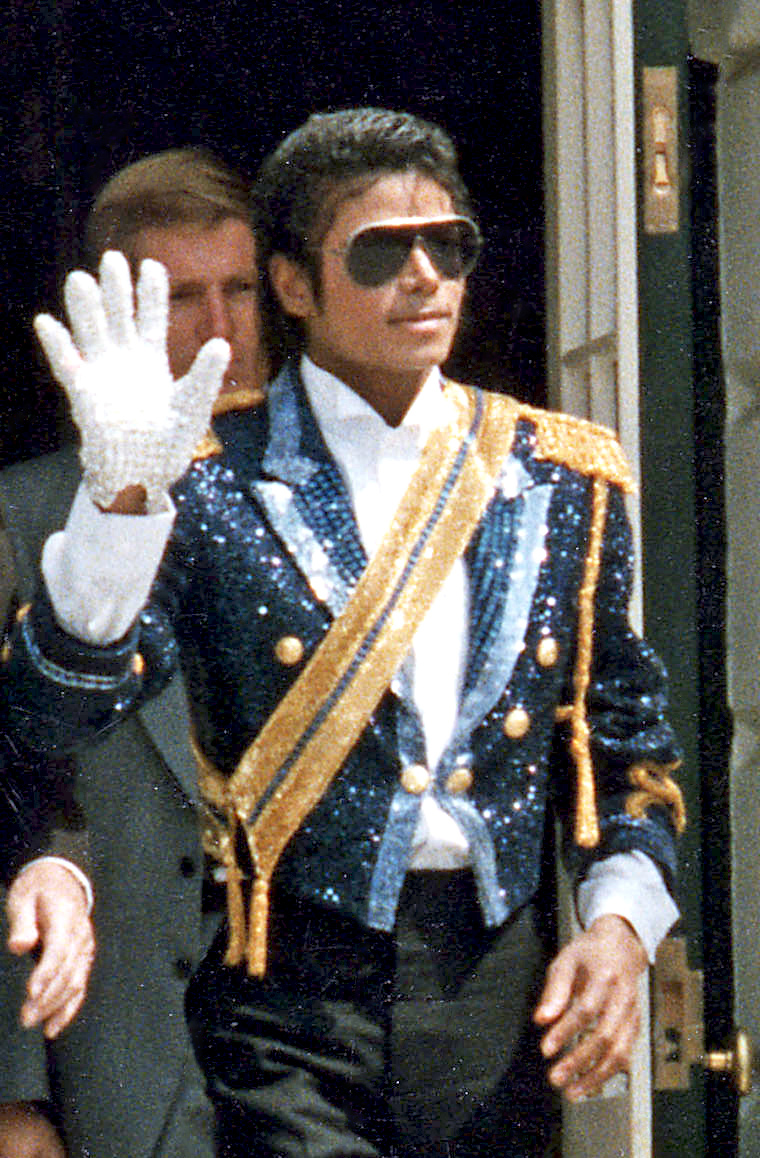
Michael Jackson, composer of "Beat It", thought Yankovic's parody was a "funny idea" (1984, White House Photo Office).

The first parody recorded for the album was "The Brady Bunch", a parody of "The Safety Dance" by Men Without Hats, in which the narrator expresses his dislike of the sitcom The Brady Bunch and suggests that the viewer watch something else, like Three's Company, 60 Minutes, or MTV. The song also contains a lyrical adaptation of the "Brady Bunch Theme Song". Recorded on the same day as "The Brady Bunch", "I Lost on Jeopardy" is a parody of "Jeopardy" by the Greg Kihn Band. The song describes a situation in which the narrator loses spectacularly on the game show Jeopardy!. Show announcer Don Pardo lends his voice to a segment of the song. In order to create the parody, Yankovic cleared the idea not only with Greg Kihn, but also with Merv Griffin, who created the show. Don Pardo, Art Fleming, and Kihn all appeared in the music video. Kihn, the composer of the original song, was extremely pleased and flattered by the parody. In 2009, Kihn wrote a blog on his MySpace called "Weird Al and Mailbox Money", in which he complimented Yankovic's comedy and explained the mechanics of how a parody works. Kihn referred to the royalty checks he still receives from "I Lost on Jeopardy" as "Mailbox Money".

"I Lost on Jeopardy" (sample)
"I Lost on Jeopardy", from Yankovic's 1984 album In 3-D.

The next parodies to be recorded were "Theme from Rocky XIII (The Rye or the Kaiser)", a parody of Survivor's "Eye of the Tiger", about a washed-up Rocky Balboa who now runs a deli and occasionally beats up on the liverwurst; and "King of Suede", a parody of the Police's "King of Pain", about a clothing store owner who claims the titular title. In order to research information for the latter, Yankovic would walk around in fabric stores taking notes. He later remarked, "I got a lot of nasty stares from store managers."

"Eat It" (sample)
"Eat It", from Yankovic's 1984 album In 3-D. The sample illustrates Yankovic's recreation of the original song, including a change of key and comic sound effects.

The final parody recorded for the album was "Eat It", a parody of Michael Jackson's "Beat It", about an exasperated parent whose picky child is refusing to eat. Yankovic formulated the idea during a brainstorming session between himself, Robert K. Weiss, and his manager, Jay Levey. They were bouncing ideas off one another until suddenly "[they] had the whole thing written." Although he knew that the best way to get permission to parody a song was through the official songwriter, Yankovic was unsure what type of reaction he would get from Jackson when presented with the parody lyrics. However, Jackson allegedly thought it was a "funny idea", and allowed the parody. In the mockumentary The Compleat Al, there is a scene portraying the fictitious meeting of Yankovic and Jackson. Musically, the parody is slightly different from the original, being set in a changed key, comic sound effects, and an Eddie Van Halen-inspired guitar solo from Yankovic's producer, Rick Derringer.

"Eat It" was Yankovic's first—and, until "Smells Like Nirvana" (1992), his only—Top Forty hit, peaking at number twelve on the Billboard Hot 100. It was also Yankovic's highest-charting single until "White & Nerdy" reached number nine on the October 21, 2006, Billboard chart. "Eat It" was a worldwide hit, even managing to peak at number one in Australia. For many years, Yankovic became known colloquially as "The 'Eat It' guy." He referred to this sarcastically on his own personal Twitter; at one point, Al's Twitter Bio read: "You know ... the Eat It guy."

One of the last songs recorded for the album was "Polkas on 45". The song, whose title is a take on the novelty act Stars on 45, is a medley of popular rock songs from the 1960s and 1970s. "Polkas on 45" evolved from an early polka medley that Yankovic had played when opening for new wave band Missing Persons in 1982. This early version included parts of various new wave songs, including "Jocko Homo" by Devo, "Homosapien" by Pete Shelley, "Sex Junkie" by Plasmatics, "T.V.O.D." by the Normal, "Bad Boys Get Spanked" by the Pretenders, "TV Party" by Black Flag, "Janitor" by Suburban Lawns, and "People Who Died" by Jim Carroll. After being asked how he picked the songs to include, Yankovic responded, "I just pick songs that sound slightly better done polka style—the way God intended."

== Critical reception ==
Professional ratings
Review scores
Source	Rating
AllMusic	4.5/5 stars
The Daily Vault	B+
Pitchfork	9.0/10
The Rolling Stone Album Guide	3/5 stars
The Village Voice	C+

The album received a score of four and a half stars from AllMusic, with Eugene Chadbourne saying, "With an album behind him, Weird Al Yankovic makes much of the improvements expected of new artists when they get a second crack at a release a year later." Christopher Thelen from The Daily Vault wrote that "All in all, this disc held out the promise that Yankovic was destined for greatness ..." In addition, "Weird Al" Yankovic in 3-D was also named one of the Year's Top 10 Albums in 1984 by People magazine. Den of Geek even named In 3-D as one of the "10 Reasons Why 1984 Was a Great Year for Geek Movies"—despite it not being a movie. On November 1, 2011, Spin magazine named In 3-D as the seventeenth greatest comedy album of all time.

Not all reviews were positive, however. Robert Christgau of The Village Voice gave the album a C+ rating, calling it "Mad for the ears." Some critics were split on how Yankovic composed, performed, and recorded his parodies, compared to his 1983 debut album. The Daily Vault commented thus:

Parody-wise, Yankovic still always managed to throw a different loop into the music to make it sound different than the song it was based on. (I happen to like the fact that Yankovic now writes parodies to sound exactly like the original song.) As a result, "Theme From Rocky XIII" doesn't have the crispness as the original song from Survivor did, "The Brady Bunch" is sped up (in both tempo and pitch) from Men Without Hats's "The Safety Dance", and "Eat It" takes Michael Jackson's "Beat It" and raises the pitch.

Many of the songs and singles from In 3-D would later appear on greatest hits albums. "Eat It" and "I Lost on Jeopardy" appeared both on Yankovic's first greatest hits album (1988) and on The Essential "Weird Al" Yankovic (2009); the latter also included "Polkas on 45". Seven of the album's songs ("Polkas on 45", "Midnight Star", "Eat It", "Mr. Popeil", "I Lost on Jeopardy", "Buy Me a Condo", and "King of Suede") appeared in Yankovic's box set Permanent Record: Al in the Box.

At the 27th Grammy Awards in 1985, "Weird Al" Yankovic won his first Grammy Award, the Best Comedy Performance Single or Album, Spoken or Musical, for his hit single "Eat It".

== Commercial performance ==
"Weird Al" Yankovic in 3-D was released on February 28, 1984. On April 28, it peaked at number 17, where it remained for three consecutive weeks. In 3-D spent a total of twenty-three weeks on the chart. It was also successful in Australia, where it peaked at number 61 on the album chart. Many of the album's singles also went on to be successful. "Eat It" eventually sold over a half a million copies, peaked at number twelve domestically on the Billboard Hot 100, and was certified Gold. It was also a worldwide hit, peaking at number thirty-six in the United Kingdom and number one in Australia. As of March 2012, "Eat It" is currently Yankovic's only number one single in any country. "King of Suede" and "I Lost on Jeopardy", the album's follow up singles, peaked on the Hot 100 at numbers 61 and 82, respectively.

On April 30, 1984, two months after its release, the album was certified Gold by the Recording Industry Association of America (RIAA), making it Yankovic's first Gold record. On August 18, 1995, it was certified Platinum by the RIAA.

== Track listing ==
Side one
No.	Title	Writer(s)	Parody of	Length
1.	"Eat It"	Michael Jackson, Alfred Yankovic	"Beat It" by Michael Jackson	3:21
2.	"Midnight Star"	Yankovic	Original	4:35
3.	"The Brady Bunch"	Ivan Doroschuk, Sherwood Schwartz, Frank De Vol, Yankovic	"The Safety Dance" by Men Without Hats	2:37
4.	"Buy Me a Condo"	Yankovic	Style parody of Bob Marley and reggae, specifically "Buffalo Soldier"	3:45
5.	"I Lost on Jeopardy"	Gregory Kihn, Steve Wright, Yankovic	"Jeopardy" by the Greg Kihn Band	3:28
6.	"Polkas on 45"	Various	A polka medley including: "Jocko Homo" by Devo; "Smoke on the Water" by Deep Purple; "Sex (I'm a ...)" by Berlin; "Hey Jude" by the Beatles; "L.A. Woman" by the Doors; "In-A-Gadda-Da-Vida" by Iron Butterfly; "Hey Joe" by the Jimi Hendrix Experience; "Burning Down the House" by Talking Heads; "Hot Blooded" by Foreigner; "Bubbles in the Wine" by Lawrence Welk; "Every Breath You Take" by the Police; "Should I Stay or Should I Go" by the Clash; "Jumpin' Jack Flash" by the Rolling Stones; "My Generation" by the Who; "Ear Booker Polka" by "Weird Al" Yankovic	4:23

Side two
No.	Title	Writer(s)	Parody of	Length
7.	"Mr. Popeil"	Yankovic	Style parody of the B-52s	4:42
8.	"King of Suede"	Gordon Sumner, Yankovic	"King of Pain" by the Police	4:13
9.	"That Boy Could Dance"	Yankovic	Original	3:34
10.	"Theme from Rocky XIII"	Frank Sullivan, James Peterik, Yankovic	"Eye of the Tiger" by Survivor	3:37
11.	"Nature Trail to Hell"	Yankovic	Original	5:55
Total length:				44:03

== Personnel ==
Credits adapted from LP liner notes, except where noted.

Band members

- "Weird Al" Yankovic – vocals, accordion, piano, synthesizer
- Jim West – guitars
- Steve Jay – bass guitar, banjo, talking drums
- Jon "Bermuda" Schwartz – drums, percussion

Additional musicians

- Rick Derringer – guitar, mandolin; backing vocals
- Lisa Popeil – female background vocals
- Pattie Brooks – female background vocals
- Petsye Powell – female background vocals
- Andrea Robinson – female background vocals
- Bob Tebow – bass vocals
- Pat Regan – synthesizer, piano
- Jimmy Zavala – saxophone
- Warren Luening – trumpet
- Joel Peskin – clarinet
- Jim Self – tuba
- Joel Miller – bongos
- "Musical Mike" Kieffer – musical hands
- Don Pardo – spoken word vocal (track 5)

Technical

- Rick Derringer – producer
- Tony Papa – engineer
- Lane/Donald – art direction
- Jim Heimann – cover illustration
- Jay Pope – cover photo

== Charts ==
Chart (1984)	Peak position
Australian Albums (Kent Music Report)	61
US Billboard 200	17

=== Singles ===
Year	Song	Peak positions		
Year	Song	US	AUS	UK
1984	"Eat It"	12	1	36
1984	"King of Suede"	62	—	—
1984	"I Lost on Jeopardy"	81	—	—

== Certifications ==
Country	Certification (sales thresholds)
Canada	Gold
United States	Platinum
