= I Love Rocky Road =

1983 single by "Weird Al" Yankovic

Single by "Weird Al" Yankovic

from the album "Weird Al" Yankovic
- B-side: "Happy Birthday"
- Released: July 5, 1983
- Recorded: September 2, 1981 & March 14, 1982
- Genre: Comedy rock; hard rock; parody
- Length: 2:33
- Label: Scotti Brothers
- Songwriters: Alan Merrill; Jake Hooker; "Weird Al" Yankovic
- Producer: Rick Derringer

"Weird Al" Yankovic singles chronology
"Ricky" (1983)	"I Love Rocky Road" (1983)	"Eat It" (1984)

Music video
- "I Love Rocky Road" on YouTube

"I Love Rocky Road" is a song by American musician "Weird Al" Yankovic about a man's obsession with rocky road ice cream. It is a parody of the Arrows' 1975 song, "I Love Rock 'n' Roll", originally sung and written by Alan Merrill, in the style of Joan Jett and the Blackhearts.

== Track listing ==
1. "I Love Rocky Road" – 2:35
2. "Happy Birthday" – 2:26

== Music video ==
The music video was the directorial debut of Dror Soref and parodies the "I Love Rock 'n Roll" music video. Dr. Demento makes a cameo appearance in the video as a cashier.

The "ice cream" used in the video is actually mashed potatoes, since real ice cream would melt under stage lights. Yankovic recalled during an interview with GQ that he accidentally bit into the mashed potatoes after turning his head because the ice cream scoop on top of the mashed potatoes fell off, he stated during the same interview that they got through the shot but "it was disgusting."

== Chart positions ==
Chart (1983)	Peak Position
U.S. Billboard Bubbling Under Hot 100 Singles	106
U.S. Cashbox Top 100	78

== Rerecording ==
In 2022, for the film WEIRD: The Al Yankovic Story, Yankovic rerecorded the track as well as four others. In the film, Yankovic first plays the song in a bar. Different from the album version, it starts out with just Yankovic and the accordion, and near the end of the first verse Jim Kimo West, Steve Jay, and Jon Bermuda Schwartz spontaneously join in on guitar, bass, and drums. After the song is finished, Dr. Demento, who was in the audience, comes up to Yankovic and asks to be his agent, to which Yankovic says yes.

== LadBaby version ==
"I Love Sausage Rolls"

Single by LadBaby
- Released: 13 December 2019
- Recorded: 2019
- Length: 3:23
- Label: Frtyfve
- Songwriters: Alan Merrill; Jake Hooker

LadBaby singles chronology
"We Built This City" (2018)	"I Love Sausage Rolls" (2019)	"Don't Stop Me Eatin'" (2020)

Music video
- "I Love Sausage Rolls" on YouTube

In December 2019, English blogger LadBaby released a comedy version of the song with a sausage roll theme as a charity single whose profits went to The Trussell Trust. The single's cover is based on Abbey Road's cover. The song peaked at number one on the UK Singles Chart and in Scotland.

=== Background ===
In December 2019, LadBaby announced his bid for the official Christmas number one. As with their last release "We Built This City", all proceeds from the single went to The Trussell Trust. He said, "We were blown away by the support we received on our Christmas Number 1 single last year and how far that money has gone into changing the lives of families living in poverty across the UK. We're continually looking for ways we can support food bank charity the Trussell Trust further as the size of the problem still facing so many adults (and children) is huge and we ALL need to do whatever we can to say goodbye to poverty once and for all in the UK! If we can use our social media presence for good by singing about sausage rolls, giving people something to smile about and helping families eat this year, then why wouldn't we. Officially, the most unanticipated single of the decade...AGAIN!"

=== Charts ===
On 20 December 2019, the song entered the UK Singles Chart at number one, claiming the Christmas number one with 93,000 chart sales and with 85,000 of that total coming via downloads. It was also the fastest-selling download since Artists for Grenfell version of "Bridge over Troubled Water" in June 2017. LadBaby became the third act to have two consecutive Christmas number one singles and the first to have two successive novelty Christmas number ones in the UK. After reaching number one, LadBaby said, "How have we done this again? It's the best feeling in the world – it's a Christmas miracle yet again! Thank you everybody for supporting us once again, and all for an amazing cause. It's going to the Trussell Trust – to the 14 million people living in poverty in the UK. Who doesn't love a sausage roll at Christmas?" The song dropped from number one to number 57, and was overtaken by English singer Ellie Goulding's cover of the Joni Mitchell song, "River" (1971).

Chart (2019)	Peak position
Australia (ARIA)	100
Ireland (IRMA)	59
New Zealand Hot Singles (RMNZ)	20
Scottish Singles Sales (Official Charts)	1
UK Singles (Official Charts)	1
UK Indie (Official Charts)	1
US Hot Rock Songs (Billboard)	10

== See also ==
- List of singles by "Weird Al" Yankovic
- List of songs by "Weird Al" Yankovic
