= Rock 'n Roll Records =

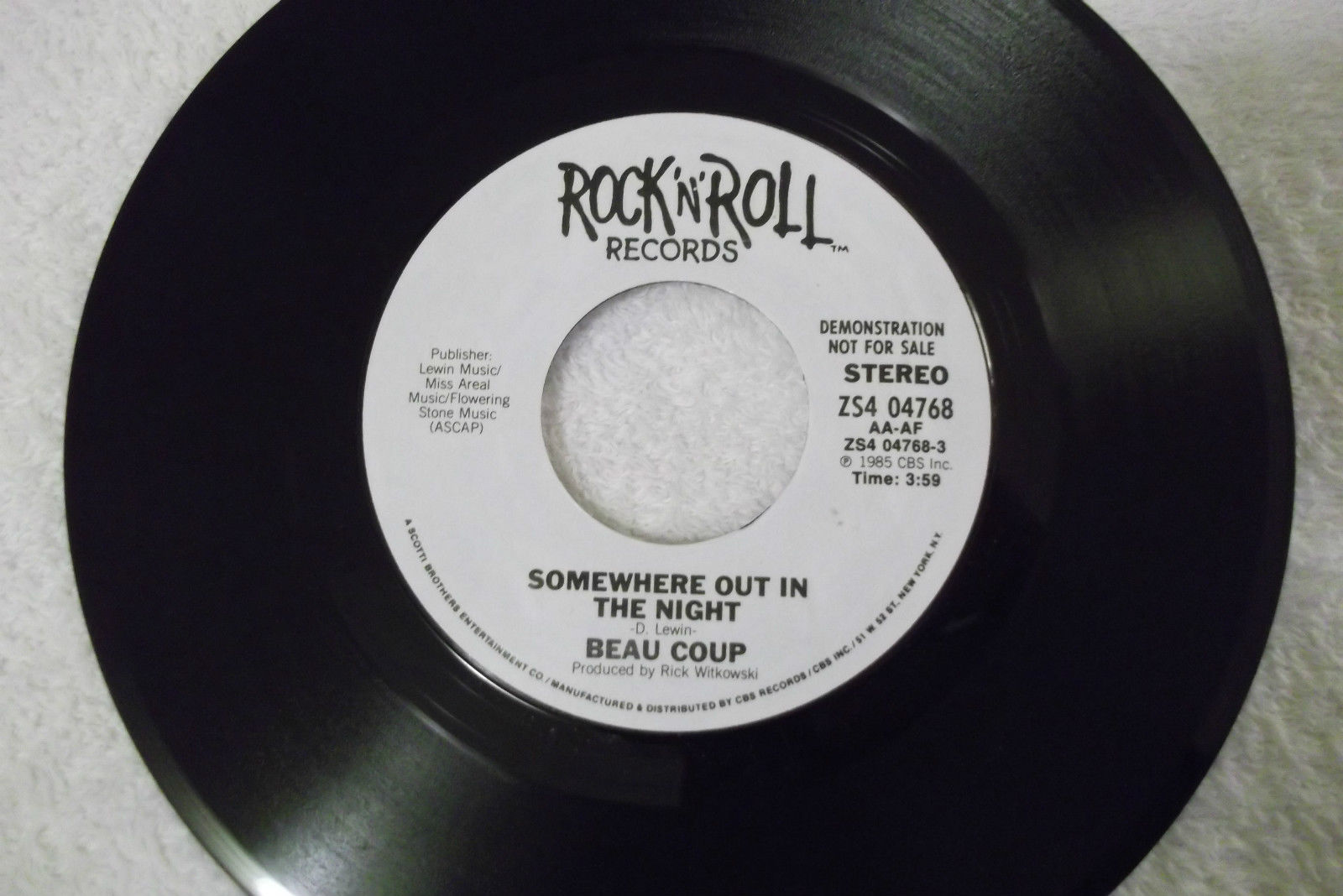
- Parent company: Scotti Brothers Records
- Status: Defunct
- Distributor: CBS/Epic
- Genre: Various
- Country of origin: United States

Rock 'n' Roll Records was a subsidiary record label under Scotti Brothers Records (also known as Scotti Bros. Records), which was a California-based record label founded by Tony and Ben Scotti. The label is most noted for helping to launch the career of parodist "Weird Al" Yankovic. Other artists on the label included Felony and Hisao Shinagawa, among other novelty, rock, pop, and new wave bands and artists.

Rock 'n' Roll's music catalogue now belongs to Volcano Entertainment, a division of Sony Music.

== See also ==
- List of record labels
