= List of Sliders characters =

This is a list of Sliders characters, a science fiction television show that aired on the Fox network for three seasons and the Sci Fi Channel for two seasons. The show starred Jerry O'Connell as Quinn Mallory, a college student who builds a device that can transport himself and others to parallel worlds. Due to the nature of the show's similar (yet always slightly different) worlds conceit, several actors appear as different versions of the same character. The following is a list of actors who have appeared on Sliders.

== Main cast ==
Character	1994-95 season	1995-96 season	1996-97 season	1997-98 season	1998-99 season
Character	Season 1	Season 2	Season 3	Season 4	Season 5
=== Regulars ===
Quinn Mallory	Jerry O'Connell	Jerry O'Connell	Jerry O'Connell	Jerry O'Connell	
Wade Welles	Sabrina Lloyd	Sabrina Lloyd	Sabrina Lloyd		
Rembrandt Brown	Cleavant Derricks	Cleavant Derricks	Cleavant Derricks	Cleavant Derricks	Cleavant Derricks
Maximillian Arturo	John Rhys-Davies	John Rhys-Davies	John Rhys-Davies		
Maggie Beckett			Kari Wuhrer	Kari Wuhrer	Kari Wuhrer
Colin Mallory				Charlie O'Connell	
Mallory					Robert Floyd
Diana Davis					Tembi Locke
=== Recurring ===
Amanda Mallory	Linda Kaye Henning	Deanne Henry	Linda Kaye Henning	Linda Kaye Henning	Linda Kaye Henning
Michael Mallory	Tom Butler	Tom Butler	Jim Turner	John Walcutt	
Conrad Bennish Jr.	Jason Gaffney				
Wing	Yee Jee Tso				
Ross J. Kelly	John Novak	John Novak			
Pavel Kurlienko	Alex Bruhanski	Alex Bruhanski			
Michael Hurley	Gary Jones	Gary Jones			
Artie Feld	Don MacKay	Don MacKay			
Gomez Calhoun	Will Sasso	Will Sasso		Israel Juarbe	Israel Juarbe
Mace Moon	Gerry Nairn				
Ryan Simms	Nicholas Lea	Nicholas Lea			
Elston Diggs			Lester Barrie		
Tess Martin			Terry Markwell		
Angus Rickman			Roger Daltrey; Neil Dickson		
Malcolm Eastman			Wes Charles Jr.		
Elizabeth Mallory				Marnie McPhail	
Kolitar				Reiner Schöne	
Hal				Scott Klace	Scott Klace
Oberon Geiger					Peter Jurasik

=== Quinn Mallory ===
Quinn Mallory
- First appearance: "Sliders, Part One"
- Last appearance: "Revelations"
- Created by: Tracy Tormé; Robert K. Weiss
- Portrayed by: Jerry O'Connell

In-universe information
- Nickname: Q-Ball (indicating his role as instigator of their adventures)
- Occupation: Physics graduate student
- Family: Michael Mallory (father); Amanda Mallory (mother); Michael Mallory (II) (biological father); Elizabeth Mallory (biological mother); Colin Mallory (brother)

Quinn was born in 1973 and raised in San Francisco, California, the son of Michael and Amanda Mallory. The driver's license shown in the episode "Summer of Love" indicates his birthday is January 24, but in the same episode, Wade says that Quinn is a Libra, which would put his birthday between September 23 and October 22.

Quinn was skipped ahead two grades in school at some point before 1984. He was bullied in junior high, and being skipped ahead two grades made him smaller and physically slower than his classmates. His father died in 1984. The week after his father's death, several students, including Rex Crandall, bullied Quinn at school, which ended in an incident where he hit Rex with a baseball bat. Quinn shattered Rex's kneecap, and Rex walked with a limp for the rest of his life. In the episode "The Guardian", on a world where events occurred as they did on Earth Prime twelve years ago, Quinn prevented history from repeating itself.

In "Summer of Love", Quinn confesses to Arturo that he was starting quarterback in high school (indicating that despite being slower than his classmates in junior high, he became an athlete in high school, probably driven by a in this case healthy inferiority complex). In the episode "Slide Like an Egyptian", Quinn meets his father in the afterlife while being used for life after death experiments. They discuss how they enjoyed playing American football together.

Invention of sliding

Quinn attended the fictional California University during the early 1990s to earn his master's degree in physics, specializing in superstring theory. In 1994, he invented a device that allows people to travel from one parallel dimension to another. Quinn referred to this technology as "sliding." On September 27, he went through the vortex with Wade Welles and Maximillian Arturo. Rembrandt Brown happened to be traveling in the area and was accidentally pulled into the vortex.

The four of them landed on a parallel world where San Francisco was in an ice age. They holed up in Rembrandt's car until a deadly tornado headed their way. Because of the way the sliding technology functioned, the group's only choices were to reset the timer and potentially lose the possibility to go home, or to wait for the timer to hit zero and go home then. Since the tornado was likely to kill them, Quinn had to reset the timer and lost the ability to return himself and the others home. For the next five years, Quinn and the others slid randomly to each world with a fixed amount of time on each one, hoping one of those trips would take them back to their own earth.

Distant origin

In the fourth-season premiere "Genesis", Quinn learned that he was not originally from Earth Prime, but that he was actually from Kromagg Prime, an Earth where humans and Kromaggs coexisted until a civil war broke out between the two species. He learned that he was transported to Earth Prime when he was a baby and left with his parents' doubles. When his parents came back to get him, his adoptive parents were too attached to him so they hid Quinn, and Quinn was raised on Earth Prime. Quinn only learned this after he returned to Earth Prime after the Kromaggs had invaded two months prior. He also learned that he had a brother, Colin, who was transported to another alternate Earth as well.

The Unstuck Man

In the season five premiere "The Unstuck Man", Quinn and his brother Colin were unwillingly used in an experiment by Dr. Oberon Geiger to merge people and parallel worlds. As a result of this experiment, Quinn was merged with a fraternal double of his who was referred to as "Mallory" (although his double's personality became dominant).

After Mallory was sliding for a while, the Sliders met back with Dr. Geiger in the episode "Eye of the Storm", and he attempted to unmerge Quinn from his double. Unfortunately, Dr. Geiger said that the two had been merged for too long and the only way to bring Quinn back would require killing Mallory. Rembrandt said that Quinn wouldn't want that, so Dr. Geiger ended the experiment and Quinn was presumed to be gone for good. But near the end of the series, Mallory would again show signs that Quinn still existed within him.

Relationships

- Wade Welles: Quinn and Wade were close friends, working at the Doppler Computer Store. Wade had a crush on Quinn, something that he was too oblivious to notice for some time. Afterwards, both were too shy and occupied by situations they were thrown in to act upon their feelings; it was never followed through due to a calamity befalling the Sliders.
- Maximillian Arturo: Being Quinn's professor, it wasn't always easy for Arturo to accept his student surpassing him. However, Arturo often doubled as a surrogate father for Quinn. Quinn's relationship with Arturo meant a lot to him, and Quinn was very hurt when Colonel Rickman murdered him.
- Rembrandt Brown: Initially, Rembrandt was at odds with Quinn, being the only one not to consent to sliding. The bitterness continued for a short duration, but dulled as Rembrandt gained respect for Quinn. The two became fairly close friends, though they still occasionally harbored conflicting views. Rembrandt gave Quinn the nickname "Q-Ball". In "Genesis" when given the choice to stay on Earth Prime to continue to fight the Kromaggs or go Sliding again, Rembrandt told Quinn "you know I'm always with you Q-Ball."
- Maggie Beckett: Quinn might have been attracted to Maggie. In "The Breeder", Wade remarked to Quinn, "You have a thing for her [Maggie]?" which Quinn denied. In "The Exodus, Part Two", Dr. Stephen Jensen (Maggie's husband at the time) accused Quinn of having a romantic interest in Maggie, saying "I see the way the two of you look at each other and I don't like it." Quinn told Dr. Jensen that he felt Maggie is just someone he had to put up with, but Dr. Jensen did not believe him. In "The Other Slide of Paradise," Maggie and Quinn kissed when it appeared they wouldn't ever see each other again and Maggie's fantasy in "Virtual Slide" showed that she held feelings for Quinn. In "Roads Taken", Quinn and Maggie were married in a "bubble universe" that existed only for the two of them.
- Colin Mallory: When Quinn first found out he was from a parallel world he was initially shocked, when he heard he had a long lost brother he was overjoyed. At meeting Colin in person Quinn was impressed at how his brother was a genius on a world that had not developed beyond Amish standards, and the angst of the wild west. He initially took on the role of teacher to him as Colin needed an adjustment period so that he could embrace more modern technology. The two of them developed a scientific dynamic nearly similar to how Quinn and the Professor interacted. The both of them were initially lost in the same vortex that merged Quinn with his fraternal double.

=== Wade Wells ===
Wade Wells
- First appearance: "Sliders, Part One"
- Last appearance: "This Slide Of Paradise"
- Created by: Tracy Tormé; Robert K. Weiss
- Portrayed by: Sabrina Lloyd

In-universe information
- Title: Clerk
- Occupation: Doppler Computers
- Family: Don Wells (father) Kelly Wells (Sister)

Character history

Wade Wells was one of the first Sliders to travel after being invited to by Quinn. At home, she was a computer store clerk at Doppler Computer Store working for her boss Mr. Hurley. At the time Wade had the biggest crush on Quinn though he failed to notice.

She was one of the more optimistic people in the group, and enjoyed sliding as an adventure through her first year, though winning a deadly lottery that resulted in Quinn being shot in the back sobered her a bit to her situation. She brought to the team computer expertise not limited to hacking, and was a believer in the supernatural due to being friends with a witch (Aptly named Sabrina) at Home.

She was extremely crushed when Arturo was murdered and her time dealing with it was further burdened by newcomer Maggie Beckett. It made her so distant that she once nearly joined a rock band whose leader was a Vampire, though Quinn after rescuing her let her know that she would always have the group, she stressed to him that she needed to hear it more often in some people.

Wade's final slide with the main group would presumably return her home, but only with Rembrandt as Quinn elected to stay behind with Maggie to help her fight Rickman.

Kromagg abduction

3 months after returning to Earth Prime the Kromaggs invaded and took her and Rembrandt Prisoner. They were questioned by the Kromaggs, sometimes together, sometimes not. Due to the Kromaggs superior mental powers they never knew what was real after a while until she was threatened with being shipped to a Kromagg Breeding Camp. She was soon sent to the camp, which haunted Rembrandt for a long time.

Requiem

Wade was eventually chosen by the Kromagg Dynasty for a last-ditch experimental weapon to "Re-Repatriate" the Kromagg Homeworld. Her body and mind became a living computer weapon to harness her mind power and the power of other living computers to bypass the Slidecage, a device that prevented Sliders from ever returning to the Kromagg Homeworld. She presumably died while rescuing Rembrandt from the Garrison that held her, though Rembrandt heard her final words: That she would be there whenever he needed her.

Relationship with Other Sliders

Wade had a strong crush on Quinn. Quinn was oblivious to this though at certain times the pair of them would explore their feelings as they once made out in his basement on a world that was about to end. Sometime later it was revealed that she later regretted this, though the two of them would grow to care for one another. The possibility of the two of them being married was seen on another world where their doubles were successful business tycoons in an unsuccessful marriage as Wade's Double murdered her husband.

Wade and the Professor would often be in conflict, with the Professor's firm stance on science explaining things logically, and Wade's belief in the supernatural. They would eventually grow a close friendship where they would know how to push one another's buttons, though would look out for one another. The Professor would often refer to her as "Miss Wells". She was devastated after he was murdered by Col. Rickman.

She & Rembrandt, in his words, were the only "normal" ones in the group as Quinn and the Professor were "eggheads". She would confess to him first of her desire to one day have children, and Rembrandt told her that with her presence he gets a part of his wish to be back at home. He had also once explained to her about the fine line between faith and superstition. When the Kromaggs augmented her into a living weapon he was the one she had a psychic link too, and she prevented him from staying behind with her by returning him to the group.

Maggie Beckett was initially hostile toward her, something she reciprocated after Maggie downplayed the Professor's death and claimed she was weak. Wade did not appreciate her military philosophy of shooting first nor her desire for revenge against Col. Rickman for her husband's murder. For the longest time, Wade felt as if she was "losing everything to her" and not actually part of the group. They would later bond for a short time on a world where the dinosaurs still existed but never had the chance to bond further as she was soon separated from her and Quinn.

=== Rembrandt Lee Brown ===
Rembrandt Brown
- First appearance: "Sliders, Part One"
- Last appearance: "The Seer"
- Created by: Tracy Tormé; Robert K. Weiss
- Portrayed by: Cleavant Derricks

In-universe information
- Alias: The Crying Man
- Nickname: Remmy
- Occupation: Singer

In 1994, Rembrandt was living in San Francisco. Rembrandt is a musician, whose stage name is The Crying Man because of his ability to "cry real tears" on stage. It is stated by Wade in Summer of Love that Rembrandt is a Gemini; however, a "slide online" feature of the Sci Fi Channel's Sliders website listed Rembrandt's birthdate to be March 4, 1955. He served time in the US Navy, and he is the only character to remain with the show for the whole series. He was the main character during the fifth season of Sliders.

Rembrandt Brown had a promising singing career until he had a falling out with his singing group, 'The Spinning Topps.' In the years that followed, Rembrandt took increasingly lower paying jobs as his fame waned; however, he believed he could stage a comeback on September 27, 1994, when he was going to sing the national anthem at a San Francisco Giants baseball game. On his way to the stadium, Rembrandt was pulled into Quinn Mallory's sliding vortex along with his Cadillac. Rembrandt was the only of the original four sliders who didn't choose to slide and had no background in science. At the beginning, he strongly resented Quinn for accidentally pulling him into the vortex. However, Quinn and Rembrandt later became good friends. During one slide, Rembrandt discovered a world where his double achieved fame and fortune after breaking off for a solo career. With the world believing that their version had died in a mysterious accident, Rembrandt was able to step into his double's life and, albeit briefly, enjoy the fame and fortune he always wanted. Eventually realizing that his inability to achieve stardom on his own Earth was due to his own ego, and that his double had worked hard for these achievements, he decided to return with Quinn and the other sliders in the search for home. Wade and Rembrandt were able to slide to Earth Prime in 1997 or 1998. However, the Kromaggs quickly took over that world and captured them. The Kromaggs threatened to send Wade to a breeder camp on another world if she didn't tell them how to find Quinn, whose independent development of sliding would allow them to invade their own homeworld, Kromagg Prime. Rembrandt couldn't tell them what he didn't know, so Wade was sent to the breeder camp. A month after Wade was taken, Quinn and fellow slider Maggie Beckett freed Rembrandt from the Kromagg prison. After this experience, he had strong guilty feelings towards what happened to Wade, as well as anger toward the Kromaggs.

Rembrandt is the only character who stayed in the show from the first to the last episode. He had to see the death of Maximillian Arturo as well as deal with the fates of Wade Welles and Quinn and Colin Mallory. In the final episode, "The Seer", Rembrandt found a biological weapon there that he intended to use against the Kromagg invaders on Earth Prime. At the same time, a psychic (who already knew a lot about the Sliders, suggesting that the psychic's powers might be real) predicted that the next time the Sliders would slide, they would die. Rembrandt decided to slide alone for this slide because the Kromagg sliding equipment being used was heavily damaged and would only accommodate one person. The others believed they might have altered the future predicted by the psychic by having only Rembrandt slide instead of all four of them. The seer died before he could answer them.

Music career

Rembrandt Brown has a career as a musician. He is called The Crying Man because he cries real tears on stage. Some of his songs include:

- Cry Like a Man
- Tears in My 'Fro
- Love Explosion
- Head-Butt Me
- Weeping Wall of Tears
- Explosion of Love
- Who Stole My Woman?
- I'd Pawn My Gold Crown For You (hit in an alternate universe)
- Wave of Tears (hit in 'The King is Back')
- I'm a Tear Jerk

Rembrandt used to sing with a group called The Spinning Topps (parody of The Four Tops and The Spinners) with three other members. His last performance with the Spinning Topps was in December 1986 (Reference: Into the Mystic).

=== Maximillian Arturo ===
Maximilian Arturo
- First appearance: "Sliders, Part One"
- Last appearance: "The Exodus, Part II" (chronological) "The Last of Eden" (airdate)
- Created by: Tracy Tormé; Robert K. Weiss
- Portrayed by: John Rhys-Davies

In-universe information
- Nicknames: Prof; Professor; Max
- Title: Professor
- Occupation: Professor

Maximillian P. Arturo was born in Great Britain during the early 1940s. (His driving licence, shown in "Summer of Love," indicates that his birthdate is September 23.) When he was a young child, his aunt's house was bombed by the Luftwaffe while he and his mother were staying there. Both Arturo's mother and aunt were killed. His only memories of this incident were his mother's dead body being pulled off him. Since his father was fighting in India at the time, there was no way for Arturo to be identified, so he was put in an orphanage. After the war ended, Arturo's father came to get him ("Season's Greedings").

Arturo served in the British Army as a young adult. After completing his service, he moved to the United States, where he pursued graduate studies in physics, and met fellow student Christina Fox, whom he later married. Christina died of a brain aneurysm when she was 27 ("Eggheads"). Arturo had a son; however, it is not revealed in the show whether or not Christina Fox was the mother ("Into the Mystic"). At the beginning of the pilot, Arturo was Regents professor of cosmology and ontology at the fictional California University.

As a travelling companion, Arturo was arrogant, hot-tempered, and pompous, often referring to people who failed to meet his expectations as "blistering idiots." But he was not without a soft spot, particularly toward individuals he perceived as kindred intellects. Having been estranged from his son before he began sliding, Arturo had expressed that he wished Quinn were his son. Arturo was somewhat resentful of Quinn, jealous of Quinn's greater intelligence, as well as the fact that Quinn (and not Arturo) invented sliding.

In 1996, when the Sliders mistakenly believed they had landed home, Arturo's double attempted to impersonate him. Quinn, Wade, and Rembrandt never knew whether they took the right Arturo sliding with them or not ("Post Traumatic Slide Syndrome"). Later that year, Arturo was diagnosed with a terminal illness, and attempted to stop sliding. He continued to slide because Quinn needed him, and Quinn was more fearful of his friend and mentor's death than Arturo himself was ("The Guardian"). In mid-1997, while on an alternate Earth that was to be destroyed by a pulsar, Arturo was shot by ruthless Marine Colonel Angus Rickman. Rickman initially tried to shoot Quinn, but Arturo took the bullet for him. His last words to Quinn were, "Get them [Rembrandt and Wade] home . . . Sliders" ("The Exodus, Part Two").

Since the Sliders never determined which Arturo they took in "Post Traumatic Slide Syndrome," it is possible the original Arturo from Earth Prime is still alive, as Rembrandt said at the end of the episode, "We've got an Arturo and we don't even know which one!".

Beliefs

In the episode "Into The Mystic", Arturo expresses strong opposition to the ideas that any supernatural phenomena (such as psychics) around the Sliders were real. He believed that all that is perceived as "supernatural" is an illusion designed to fool the simple-minded. However, in the episode "Obsession," Arturo found it interesting that a psychic saved the life of the world's Abraham Lincoln.

Wrong Arturo

In the second-season episode "Post Traumatic Slide Syndrome", the vortex had opened on Quinn's front lawn as the Arturos had a showdown. Quinn wanted to "take them both (and) sort it out after we slide," but one of the Arturos said "Like hell we will," and attacked his counterpart. After a brief scuffle, one of the Arturos slugged the other one and jumped into the vortex alongside Quinn. Once the vortex closed, the remaining Arturo said "Oh my god" with a worried look on his face.

When it was left as a possibility that a double of Arturo's had slid instead of the Earth Prime Arturo, controversy has been generated among fans about which Arturo actually slid. In an interview done in 2009, the show's creator, Tracy Tormé, stated that he intended that the Arturo who slid should not be the original Arturo. But due to Tormé losing control of the show and John Rhys-Davies leaving the following year, this issue was never resolved.

Casting

In the DVD audio commentary on the Sliders pilot episode, series creators Tracy Tormé and Robert K. Weiss revealed that the character of Maximillian Arturo was very nearly played by actors other than John Rhys-Davies — Hector Elizondo was in fact the producers' final choice for the role prior to auditioning Rhys-Davies, but ultimately passed, due to the filming location. At one point, Elizondo went on a late-night talk show and mentioned that "I [would be] doing Sliders right now, except for one word: 'Vancouver'."

Also on the DVD commentary, Weiss and Tormé reveal that other actors who were considered for the role included Ricardo Montalbán and David Ogden Stiers (who was reportedly one of the chief finalists).

=== Maggie Beckett ===
Maggie Beckett
- First appearance: "The Exodus, Part I"
- Last appearance: "The Seer"
- Created by: David Peckinpah
- Portrayed by: Kari Wührer

In-universe information
- Title: Captain
- Occupation: Soldier
- Family: Thomas Beckett (father)

Character history

When the sliders first met Maggie in the episode "The Exodus", she was a captain in the United States Marines under the command of Colonel Angus Rickman. She was married to Dr. Stephen Jensen, who was in a wheelchair due to an accident a year prior. She was part of a plot to assassinate Dr. Jaribeck, a scientist who discovered that a pulsar would soon irradiate the Earth, killing all life. Since the sliders were with him when he died, Maggie questioned them about anything he might have said. The sliders managed to escape from Maggie and locked her in the trunk of a car, but Maggie arrested the sliders when she met them again at Dr. Jaribeck's office at California Institute of Technology.

When Maggie's superiors learned about sliding technology, Quinn was ordered to help Dr. Jensen (Maggie's husband) perfect his sliding technology. Maggie and Quinn were ordered to scout parallel worlds to find one that was suitable to build a colony where people would be free from the deadly pulsars.

Maggie almost died when she arrived to Earth Prime and was unable to breathe the air. Quinn concluded that the people on Maggie's earth must have different lungs from the lungs of people on Earth Prime.

Dr. Jensen felt that Quinn and Maggie were attracted to each other and was angry at Quinn because of that.

Rickman killed Dr. Jensen to keep him quiet. When Maggie found out that Rickman murdered her husband, she wanted revenge. Rickman slid, so Maggie's only way to get revenge was to slide with Quinn, Rembrandt and Wade. Right after Maggie decided to slide with the others, when Quinn said, "Welcome aboard, Captain Beckett," Maggie revealed that she resigned her position in the military and was now just "Beckett".

In the episode "Roads Taken", Quinn and Maggie went into a "bubble universe" that existed only for the two of them. In that universe, the two were married and had a child named Thomas (named after Maggie's father).

Relationship with Wade

Maggie and Wade never got along. When they first met, Wade said, "There's something about that girl I don't like. No, make that everything about that girl I don't like." Maggie was critical of the way Wade was handling the death of Maximillian Arturo and used it as evidence that she was weak. However, she started to understand as she also broke down due to her husband's death and reevaluated her opinion of Wade somewhat when Wade saved her life from a zombie commenting that Wade "showed her something" by doing that and seemed somewhat humbled by the experience. In the episode "Dinoslide", the conflict between Wade and Maggie was further examined. At the beginning of the episode, Wade was upset about Maggie's desire to kill Rickman out of revenge. Later, when the sliders encountered dinosaurs, Maggie wanted to kill the Tyrannosaurus Rex. Wade remarked, "Isn't there anything she doesn't think about killing?" By the end of the episode, there were indicators that the two were starting to get along; Wade and Maggie said, "Nice shooting!" to each other as they were shooting a gun at an oxygen tank in the dinosaur's mouth in an attempt to kill the dinosaur. The last time they saw each other was in the episode "This Slide of Paradise". At the end of the episode, Maggie said, "I'm going to miss you getting on my nerves Wade!" and then Wade responded by saying, "Same here." When Maggie met Marda in the episode "Genesis", Marda said, "Wade said you were a tough bitch," and Maggie responded, "Yeah, I bet she did!" After the Sliders lost Wade (and apparently Rembrandt for good), Maggie broke down and said she couldn't take the loss anymore until as part of Wade's last act, she returned Rembrandt to the Sliders.

Personal information

In the episode "This Slide of Paradise" it was revealed that Maggie had an affair with Angus Rickman. She said it was the biggest mistake of her life.

Maggie and her father had a strained relationship, raising her like a soldier. Maggie referred to him as "The General"

She also had an Uncle who was an organ donor.

=== Colin Mallory ===
Colin Mallory
- First appearance: "Oh Brother, Where Art Thou?"
- Last appearance: "Revelations"
- Created by: David Peckinpah
- Portrayed by: Charlie O'Connell

In-universe information
- Nickname: Farm Boy
- Occupation: Inventor
- Family: Quinn Mallory (brother)

He was introduced in the sixth episode of the fourth season, "Oh Brother, Where Art Thou?". Quinn Mallory had only learned Colin was his brother five episodes earlier in "Genesis". When the sliders found Colin, he was flying a hangglider that he invented, and had gotten stuck in a tree. The local residents were angry at Colin for doing this because they were afraid his inventions might have negative consequences. One of the residents wanted to shoot Colin to get it over with, until the sheriff told the angry residents to go home. When the sheriff said, "One of these days you're going to go a bit too far, Colin Mallory!" the sliders knew that this was Quinn's brother.

The universe Colin was raised on had far less technology than Earth Prime. Colin invented the first machine on this earth that generates electricity. This was one of his many inventions. The local residents believed that Colin was "doing the devil's work" with his inventions. Colin believed that electricity is both safe and useful and wished he could convince the local residents the same thing. Colin was in love with someone named Suzanne on his earth. However, her mother disapproved Colin, because of her fear of Colin's inventions. Suzanne was engaged to another person. Colin's adoptive parents (duplicates on the world Colin was raised of Colin's actual parents) died when Colin was very young; since this earth had little technology, there was not the medical technology necessary to cure Colin's parents of their illness.

Since the sliders had a small amount of time on this world, they had to hurry to find the microdot that would inform Colin of his origins. They found it just in time, and Colin was informed that he was originally from Kromagg Prime and that he was placed on an alternate earth when he was young so that he could be safe. Quinn and Colin's birthparents presumably did look for Colin when the war with the Kromaggs was over, but Colin's adoptive parents were dead, so his birthparents were unable to find him.

After Colin saw the microdot, Colin was resistant to sliding with Quinn and the others, since Colin didn't want to leave his world and the woman he wanted to marry. Quinn did convince Colin that his future was sliding with him, so Colin went into the vortex.

Since Colin was raised on an earth with less technology than most earths the sliders visit, he was unfamiliar with the technology he encountered. On his first slide, Colin landed in the path of a moving vehicle. Being unaware that it would be lethal to be hit by the vehicle, Colin did not get out of the way as the vehicle approached him. Quinn had to move Colin out of the way.

In the episode "Revelations", Colin met who he thought were his birthparents but it turned out they were doubles.

In the episode "The Unstuck Man", Colin was made "unstuck" in the multiverse, meaning, that he was not anchored on a particular world. This was the result of an experiment by Dr. Oberon Geiger, who later said that he was beyond his reach, possibly on another parallel world, or was destroyed in the initial encounter.

According to Marc Scott Zicree, a writer for the show, the retcon from "Genesis" was originally intended to be a red herring. The idea was that Colin was actually a clone of Quinn created by the Kromaggs as a sleeper agent within the sliders. In the original draft for "Revelations," he would flip, attacking Quinn and ending the season on a cliffhanger.

This would probably have had the effect of simplifying the somewhat complicated (and largely financially unresolvable) plot progression of the show. Nevertheless, because this would render Charlie O'Connell's character unusable in a regular capacity after Season 4, and because by that time Jerry O'Connell's residency on the show depended on his brother's presence (and because this was all before anyone knew the brothers would be departing) David Peckinpah vetoed the idea. The veto of Zicree's idea was finalized with "Lipschitz Live," in which Colin has a double (which would mean he couldn't be a clone of Quinn, unless the double is also a clone). Curiously, Charlie O'Connell also appeared in the season 3 episode "Dragonslide" as Officer O'Hara and also as Kit Richards in the episode "As Time Goes By". Although no relationship was mentioned at the time, it is assumable that O'Hara and Richards may be doubles of Colin under different names. Retroactively solidifying Colin into the series prior to his actual season 4 introduction.

=== Mallory ===
Quinn Mallory
- First appearance: "The Unstuck Man"
- Last appearance: "The Seer"
- Created by: David Peckinpah
- Portrayed by: Robert Floyd

In-universe information
- Nickname: Fog Boy
- Occupation: Science Project
- Family: Unknown

This version of Quinn Mallory is the fraternal double of the first Quinn. Unlike the first Slider of his namesake, this version of him grew up in a life of petty crime, before losing the ability to walk. Stuck in a wheelchair for about a year he was found by Doctor Oberen Geiger who used him as a test subject to combine subtle fragments of doubles across the multiverse. With this Doctor Geiger was able to restore his ability to walk. Later on one certain day, Geiger decided to use him in an experiment that merged him with a fraternal double (The Original Quinn Mallory). This experiment resulted in a combined version with a mixed-up mind, one trying to surface over the other. After helping the Sliders who were left after the experiment to stop Geiger from combining the Multiverse he decided to join them along with scientist Diana Davis.

Mallory's time with the Sliders was strained for the start of the time he was with them. Maggie was bluntly more interested in getting Quinn back at the cost of Mallory's mind, and getting into the already hectic and dangerous life of a Slider was something he had to adjust too. Soon though the mind of Original Quinn started to fade over time, and he was convinced that Quinn was gone for good.

Mallory was known for some womanizing, a history with video games, petty theft, and mixing in with the wrong crowds though he learned from these experiences.

After Geiger returned a last time they discovered that he and Quinn were merged for too long and in order for Quinn to return Mallory would not survive the process. Rembrandt knowing what Quinn would have wanted elected to stop the experiment and they remained merged, though there were subtle clues that Quinn was still alive in him.

Mallory was present when Rembrandt vortex'd out from the Seer's world unable to volunteer himself in his place.

=== Diana Davis ===
Diana Davis
- First appearance: "The Unstuck Man"
- Last appearance: "The Seer"
- Created by: David Peckinpah
- Portrayed by: Tembi Locke

In-universe information
- Occupation: Scientist & Physicist

Diana Davis led a sheltered and doted life. She was chosen for Doctor Geiger project concerning his combine device. When the Quinns were merged she was there to explain to Rembrandt and Maggie what had happened to Quinn and Colon. She soon discovered what Doctor Geiger was really up too and helped Mallory and the Sliders stop his project before joining the Sliders in the attempt to split the two Quinns.

Diana had a lot to adjust too when she began traveling with Rembrandt and Maggie. She had trouble working with a team, finding herself undefined by her ex-mentor, and the realization that Sliding would mean her life would often be in danger, a realization she came too after being introduced to the Kromaggs in a literal war zone.

After the disappearances of Quinn and Colin, Diana was the one who would take over as the scientific expert. She often carried around a portable computing device that helped her to calculate and detect temporal disturbances. A skill that would prove essential in the maintenance of the timer, reviving Wade's Conscious Mind and getting off an asteroid suspended in hyperspace. Maggie claimed that since she had a woman to relate too, the scientific stuff was easier to understand.

Diana went through some changes herself that got her to get over certain fears. She got over her fear of "The Darkness" after her brain died a few times when she was abducted to be a holographic NPC, and having her brain temporarily evolved after a lobotomy went wrong.

After the Final Attempt to split the Quinns failed she elected to stay with the Sliders after Geiger showed them the way home, this would not happen though as she was present when Rembrandt made the dangerous attempt home. She remained stranded on The Seers world along with Maggie Beckett and Mallory.

== Recurring and notable characters ==
A number of characters recurred on Sliders, the science fiction show. The show involved a concept of doubles—alternate versions of a person on alternate Earths. Thus, a number of recurring characters on Sliders were doubles of each other. There were some recurring characters, however, who were other sliders.

=== Amanda Mallory ===
Amanda Mallory is the mother of Quinn Mallory, first seen in the pilot, played by Linda Henning in six episodes and Deanne Henry in two episodes (Henry played the character in season 2; Henning played the character in all other seasons). She is the family member Quinn wishes to be reunited with upon returning to Earth Prime. Her birthday is September 27, the same day the sliders started their journey.

The first time Quinn was reunited with Amanda Mallory was at the end of "The Exodus, Part One". He was with her for 30 minutes. As soon as they were reunited, they had to take Maggie to the hospital, where Quinn and Maggie both slid. Quinn left saying that he promised his mother he would be back.

Quinn ended up being reunited again with her in the episode "Genesis" in a Kromagg prison on Earth Prime. When Quinn met his mother, he said that he did promise he would be back, but it ended up taking him longer than expected. Knowing that Kromaggs play tricks on the human mind, Quinn speculated that this was not actually his mother. While here, Mrs. Mallory told Quinn that she was not actually his birth mother, that Quinn's birthparents were the doubles of herself and her husband, Michael Mallory. She said that Quinn's actual birth parents left him with her because there was a war with the Kromaggs on that Earth, and they wanted Quinn to be safe. She then said that two years later, Quinn's birthparents came back for him but that she and Mike Mallory hid Quinn because they had become too attached to him. Amanda Mallory then gave Quinn a microdot that was implanted in her arm. Quinn was to hold the microdot to his forehead and would then be told about the story of his origins. After this conversation, Amanda Mallory was taken from the Kromaggs to an alternate Earth.

In the episode "The Seer", Mrs. Mallory was reunited with the sliders (who at the time were Rembrandt Brown, Maggie Beckett, Diana Davis, and a fraternal alternate of Quinn Mallory known as Mallory) and at this point in time had escaped from the Kromaggs at some point in the past because the Seer World was where she was transported to by the Kromaggs and had become free due to a biological weapon. Since there was a psychic on that world who was tracking the sliders' journeys, Amanda Mallory was able to learn about her son's fate; that Quinn had been merged into his fraternal alternate. Amanda Mallory now had post-traumatic stress disorder as a result of seeing her son's fate. When the Sliders timer was destroyed, she led them to Kromagg technology hoarded by Claire, the Seer's daughter and took care of the Seer after he had a heart attack. When the Sliders tried to ask the Seer if Rembrandt had survived the slide to Earth Prime, she revealed that he had died.

Maggie Beckett had lived in a "bubble universe" with Quinn where they lived an entire life together, were married and had a son. In this universe, Maggie became close to the version of Amanda Mallory and in the episode "The Seer", Maggie shared her experiences with the Amanda Mallory from Earth Prime.

Alternate versions of Amanda Mallory were seen in the episodes "Post Traumatic Slide Syndrome" and "The Guardian".

=== Michael Mallory ===
Michael Mallory is the father of Quinn Mallory who was killed in 1984, when Quinn was 11. Mr. Mallory was hit by a car on his way to work.

Michael Mallory was played by Tom Butler in the pilot and "Gillian of the Spirits"; Jim Turner in "Slide Like an Egyptian"; John Walcutt in "Genesis", "Oh Brother, Where Art Thou?", "Slidecage", "My Brother's Keeper", and "Revelations".

An alternate version of Michael Mallory was seen in the second part of the pilot at the end of the episode. Originally, Quinn and the others thought they were home, but when Quinn saw his father, he realized he was not home, as Quinn's father had been dead for ten years. When Quinn's father saw Quinn's reaction he said, "What's the matter Quinn, you look like you've seen a ghost?"

Another version of Michael Mallory was seen in the episode "Gillian of the Spirits". This was on an alternate Earth where the population was afraid of technology, and technology that was more advanced than the advancements made by the 1940s was illegal. The Michael Mallory on this Earth was an advocate of technology and spent five years in jail for possessing technology, and was released on the condition that he become an anti-technology informant. He was working with a group called Bayside Power that was secretly developing technology in the hopes that technology would be legalized. If technology becomes legal, Bayside Power intends to sell the technology they developed and have an advantage in the market because they would be the only ones with this technology.

The Quinn Mallory of this Earth died of polio. Arturo, Wade, and Rembrandt came to this Michael Mallory because the timer was broken, Quinn was missing, and they needed technology to fix the timer. Michael Mallory pretended to want to help the sliders, but in fact he only wanted to steal the timer to give its technology to Bayside Power, and then was going to kill the sliders.

When the sliders found out about Michael Mallory's intentions, they broke into his house to take the technology necessary to fix the timer. They fixed it with 17 seconds left, but right then Michael Mallory came down with a gun and told the sliders that they were not going anywhere. When they opened the vortex, Quinn, who was stuck in the astral plane, became visible by the vortex. Michael Mallory demanded the sliders turn the vortex off and announced "My son is dead!" Quinn responded saying, "I'm not the Quinn you knew but I am your son." Quinn also said that he didn't believe that his father would hurt innocent people, and then Michael Mallory put down his gun.

Quinn was reunited with his father from Earth Prime in the episode "Slide Like an Egyptian". The people of this world were conducting an experiment to kill people and bring them back to life to learn about the experiences in the afterlife. Quinn was dead for five minutes, and was the first person brought back to life. He saw his father in the afterlife; they threw the football to each other, and Quinn explained to him that he could not find his way home. Quinn's father told him, "if you can touch it, you can catch it."

In "Genesis" Quinn learned from Amanda Mallory that the people he thought were his parents were in fact alternates of his birthparents, so thus learned that the Michael Mallory from Earth Prime was not his biological father and that his biological father was still alive on Kromagg Prime. Quinn learned that the Michael Mallory from Kromagg prime built a weapon to defeat the Kromaggs.

Quinn met an alternate version of Michael Mallory in "My Brother's Keeper". This Michael Mallory is a doctor who developed a technique to clone humans. He cloned people with the money to afford it, kept the clones in a repository, and transplanted an organ from the clone if needed. Michael Mallory mistook Quinn for his own son's clone. A group of people opposed to cloning abducted Michael Mallory. One of the anti-clone advocates wanted to kill him, but Quinn wanted to use him as a bargaining chip to free his friends. After a talk between Quinn and this Michael Mallory, Michael Mallory was convinced to quit his job that involved cloning humans, and after this he opened up a clinic for people who sold their organs to the wealthy.

Quinn and Colin met a version of Michael Mallory in "Revelations" which he thought was his and Colin's birthfather and they thought they were on Kromagg Prime. As it turns out, they were on an Earth that was similar to Kromagg Prime, but not Kromagg Prime (some fans call it Kromagg Double Prime). In the 1970s, the Michael Mallory on this Earth, along with his wife Elizabeth Mallory, created a disease to destroy the Kromaggs on that Earth. Isaac Clark, who was sentenced to exile from Kromagg Prime, returned in the late 1990s with the help of the sliders and came to submit evidence against this Earth's Michael and Elizabeth Mallory to put them on trial for their crimes against the Kromaggs.

=== Elizabeth Mallory ===
Elizabeth Mallory (played by Marnie McPhail) is the mother of Quinn and Colin Mallory and is from Kromagg Prime. She is seen in the episodes "Genesis", "Oh Brother, Where Art Thou?", and "Revelations" (though the version of her in "Revelations" is a double). It is never explained why Quinn and Colin's mother is not a version of Amanda Mallory, even though Amanda Mallory did say in "Genesis" that Quinn's birthparents are the doubles of her and Michael Mallory, although this could be a case in which doubles do not look similar, like Mallory and Quinn.

=== Conrad Bennish, Junior ===
Conrad Bennish, Junior (played by Jason Gaffney) of Earth Prime is a student in the same class which Quinn Mallory is a student, and Maximillian Arturo is a professor. Arturo finds him brilliant but obnoxious. Quinn and Bennish are friends. Bennish has an interest in drugs and bombs. When the FBI showed up to question him about the disappearance of the Sliders, he said, "If this is about the bong I just bought, I thought it was a plant-holder, honest!" He dresses in a stereotypically "hippie" fashion, wearing long hair and sunglasses.

An alternate Conrad Bennish from "Summer of Love" has short hair, and identifies as a Young Republican in favor of the war that was taking place at the time on that alternate Earth.

A version of Bennish is seen in "Last Days," where it seems his genius may be unchecked, and a danger to his particular Earth. He is also trying to create the "failed" atomic bomb, which that Earth's Albert Einstein purposely sabotaged. With Professor Arturo's help, he builds one, and successfully launches it against the asteroid set on a collision course with the Earth. After the bomb is built, Arturo, knowing that Bennish will now have unchecked power after he slides to a different world, takes a crucial part of the bomb plans and keeps it. But, unbeknownst to him until just before he slides, he drops it and Bennish finds it.

The character only appeared once in the second season (and for the last time) in the episode "Invasion," though he is never named or credited as Bennish. Here, he is a prisoner of the Kromaggs, eyeless as a result.

=== Michael Hurley ===
On Earth Prime, Michael Hurley (played by Gary Jones) works at Doppler Computer Store, and was the boss of Quinn and Wade until they went sliding (September 27, 1994). On that day, Quinn's double arrived on Earth Prime, and made some remarks to Mr. Hurley that got Quinn fired.

An alternate version of Mr. Hurley is in the second part of the pilot. On an alternate Earth where, in 1994, the United States is a territory of the Soviet Union, Mr. Hurley is part of an underground American revolutionary group, and is under the command of this world's Wade Welles.

In the episode "Prince of Wails," on a world where the United States lost the Revolutionary War, and in 1995 is the "British States of America," Mr. Hurley works for this world's version of Maximilian Arturo, and was part of a plot to assassinate Prince Harold, heir to the British throne on that particular Earth. However, he is shocked by the revelation of the truth and switches sides once it is revealed, releasing Quinn and driving him to meet up with the others.

Another version of Mr. Hurley is in the episode "Time Again and World," who also worked at the Doppler Computer Store. He's one of the first to see the full Constitution for the first time in over 30 years.

=== Pavel Kurlienko ===
Every version of Pavel Kurlienko (played by Alex Bruhanski) that the Sliders have met has been a taxi driver. Two different versions of him are seen in the second part of the pilot. The first version was from the Soviet-ruled America, and was encountered by Rembrandt Brown. Pavel turned Rembrandt into the authorities on this world for handing him a dollar bill, which was the trademark of the underground American revolutionary on this alternate Earth.

Another version of Pavel was seen at the end of the episode, on an Earth that was very much like Earth Prime, but where Michael Mallory was still alive. Rembrandt feared him because Pavel was the one who turned him in to the authorities on the previous Earth. Rembrandt nearly left the taxi when Pavel said he recognized Rembrandt, but stayed when Pavel said he recognized that Rembrandt was "The Crying Man."

Other versions of Pavel are also seen in "Fever" and "Into the Mystic." When Rembrandt met the version of Pavel in "Fever," Rembrandt asked Pavel if he liked driving taxis. Pavel responded by saying "[it] was his destiny." Rembrandt said, "You don't know the half of it!"

=== Ross J. Kelly ===
Ross J. Kelly (played by John Novak) is an ambulance-chasing lawyer on most of the Earths where the Sliders encountered him during seasons 1 and 2.

On Earth Prime, Kelly was widely known for his pandering television advertisements, in which large accident settlements were promised to victims willing to hire the shyster attorney to sue for compensation on their behalf – Kelly's popular catch-line in the ads is, "I'll fight for you!!" However, Kelly himself became a collaborator with the occupying Russian government on the Soviet-ruled Earth in the pilot, and acted as a KGB interrogator during Rembrandt Brown's incarceration after that character's arrest for possession of Earth Prime American currency.

A different version of Kelly, though still very similar to his Earth Prime incarnation, was encountered in the episode "Into the Mystic", on the Mysticism Earth, where he was consulted by the Sliders about the possibility of legally defaulting on a contract made with a shaman. Kelly's advice was not to do so.

=== Gomez Calhoun ===
Gomez Calhoun (played by Will Sasso) works at the Dominion Hotel, where the Sliders stayed in seasons 1 and 2. Alternate versions of him were seen in "Fever", "The King is Back", "Gillian of the Spirits", "Greatfellas," and "Time Again and World".

On the world where Rembrandt Brown was a superstar, Calhoun informed the public that Rembrandt was staying at the hotel. This greatly annoyed Arturo. In the episode "Greatfellas," he once again revealed that Rembrandt was staying at the hotel, but this time for different reasons.

In seasons 4 and 5, the Sliders encountered alternate versions of Gomez Calhoun (played by a different actor, Israel Juarbe) working at the Chandler Hotel. He was seen in "Lipschitz Live!," "Roads Taken," and "To Catch a Slider".

=== Elston Diggs ===
Elston Diggs (played by Lester Barrie) is a waiter at the Royal Chancellor Hotel, at which the Sliders stayed during season 3. Diggs was often the person the Sliders got information from. He was seen in the episodes "Double Cross," "Desert Storm," "Murder Most Foul," and "The Breeder."

Elston Diggs was first seen in the episode "Double Cross," where he recognized Rembrandt Brown, "The Crying Man." On this world, San Francisco was just another neighborhood of a large city of San Angeles, which spanned from San Francisco to Los Angeles. Upon arriving on the next world, Rembrandt ran into Elston Diggs right after sliding, and asked him if they were still in San Angeles. Diggs said they were in Los Angeles. After this, Quinn realized that Logan St. Clair must have switched parts of the timer, so that they now had a 400-mile radius to slide within, instead of a two-mile radius.

=== Angus Rickman ===
Angus Rickman (played by Roger Daltrey) is a marine colonel on an alternate Earth that was to be destroyed by a pulsar. The character was introduced in the episode "The Exodus". He had a fungus infection in his brain which required him to extract brain tissue from the brains of compatible "donors" and inject the tissue into his brain which causes him to temporarily morph into that person. Extracting brain tissue from these people caused them to go into a coma.

Three days before the pulsar was going to destroy his Earth, the sliders landed there, helped improve the sliding technology of local scientist Dr. Stephen Jensen, which allowed Rickman and 150 other people to slide to a safe alternate Earth before the pulsars hit. Rickman specifically had Wade Welles select 150 people that had brain tissue compatible with Rickman's to slide to the new world. Originally, the sliders were going to slide with Rickman and the 150 people, but Rickman ordered the slide early, and murdered Arturo when the sliders attempted to slide with him.

Rickman also murdered Dr. Stephen Jensen, the husband of Maggie Beckett, when Jensen learned that Rickman was responsible for the coma victims. Rickman lied to Maggie and said a mob had killed him.

Quinn, Wade, and Rembrandt slid to the Earth Rickman, Maggie, and the other 150 people slid (thanks to getting deep enough underground and the new ability to track wormholes given to them by Jensen), and informed Maggie there that Rickman murdered her husband. Initially, Quinn and Maggie wanted revenge on Rickman for murdering Professor Arturo and Dr. Jensen. However, Rickman still had the timer used to send him, Maggie, and the other people to this Earth. So Rickman used the timer to slide and escape from Quinn and Maggie. The timer Rickman was using also had the coordinates to Earth Prime, which gave Quinn, Wade, and Rembrandt greater incentive to catch Rickman. The sliders began chasing Rickman to parallel Earths so that Quinn, Rembrandt, and Wade can find their home coordinates, and so that Maggie could get revenge. Although initially both Quinn and Maggie wanted revenge, Quinn later decided against revenge and only wanted his home coordinates.

The first time the sliders encountered Rickman since "The Exodus" was in the episode "The Other Slide of Darkness". By this time, Rickman's face had changed from injecting the brain tissue of non-compatible donors and he was now played by another actor, Neil Dickson. In this episode, Rickman's timer broke, leaving him unable to slide. Rickman encountered Quinn's double, the first double of his that Quinn met, and Quinn's double was going to kill Rickman. Then Rickman told Quinn's double about Quinn and the others. Quinn's double then decided to give Rickman a deal: Quinn's double would not kill Rickman and would fix his timer, and in exchange Rickman would bring Quinn to his double. Rickman did this, so Quinn's double fixed his timer, and Rickman slid. After this, Rickman's timer was counting down like the Sliders timer, indicating that Quinn's double fixed it in the same way Quinn did the original timer.

The next time the sliders encountered Rickman was in the episode "Dinoslide". He returned to the world the survivors of his world slid to in order to harvest their brain tissue, but had to contend with dinosaurs and the sliders and was forced to slide when his timer ran out, but returned later. He was defeated again, but escaped once more.

The last episode with Rickman is "This Slide of Paradise". On this Earth, the sliders manage to take Rickman's timer away from him, leaving him stranded on this Earth. Just as Quinn, Wade, and Rembrandt are about to use Rickman's timer to slide home and let Maggie use the other timer to continue sliding Rickman shows up. Quinn pushed Wade and Rembrandt through and stays behind to help Maggie fight Rickman. During the fight Rickman attempts to slide through the vortex to Earth Prime but the vortex closed just as he jumped towards it, and he falls off the cliff and dies.

=== Oberon Geiger ===
Oberon Geiger is a scientist played by Peter Jurasik. He merged Quinn with one of his alternates and caused Colin Mallory to be "unstuck" in space time. He was seen in the episodes "The Unstuck Man", "Applied Physics", and "Eye of the Storm". Dr. Geiger himself is "unstuck" in space-time, which means that he is not anchored on one parallel world and constantly slides randomly to alternate parallel worlds. Dr. Geiger has to use special equipment to stay on his Earth and even then he is only able to stay in a small part of his lab.

He is first seen in the episode "The Unstuck Man", conducting a science experiment that involved counting down to the same point in time as to when the sliders' timer would hit zero. When the sliders (which at the time were Rembrandt, Maggie, Colin, and Quinn) arrived on the new world, the people that slid out were Rembrandt, Maggie, and Mallory, who is Quinn's fraternal alternate that Maggie and Rembrandt just met. Quinn and Colin did not slide out of the vortex. Mallory had memories of the Quinn Mallory that Maggie and Rembrandt knew. When Mallory called Dr. Geiger about this, he asked Mallory if he was now two people.

At one point, Dr. Geiger agreed to extend the time Rembrandt and Maggie had to stay on the current world to give them more time to attempt to retrieve Colin and Quinn. However, this was a trap to get Rembrandt and Maggie into suspended animation.

It was Dr. Geiger who merged Quinn Mallory with his fraternal alternate, Mallory. It was also Dr. Geiger who caused Colin to be unstuck in space-time. Dr. Geiger was about to conduct another experiment to merge alternate Earths together, just like he had merged Quinn and Mallory. Dr. Geiger believed that this would create a better world. Dr. Diana Davis, who worked with Dr. Geiger and had been very supportive of him up until then, said that Dr. Geiger was forcing this on unsuspecting people who might not want this. Dr. Geiger responded saying he wasn't in the mood for an ethics debate. Mallory said that Dr. Geiger would kill millions with his experiment and that he had to be stopped. Dr. Davis ended Dr. Geiger's experiment, and caused him to be no longer anchored in the small part of his lab. Thus, Dr. Geiger was now "unstuck" again, sliding randomly between alternate worlds.

Dr. Geiger was seen again in "Applied Physics", where Dr. Geiger convinced Diana Davis that he had good intentions when he did not, and caused Diana to do something that would alter the complete history of this alternate Earth—including dramatically alter the life of her double on this Earth. His attempts to get loose on that Earth were ended when Diana's double cut power to the reactor powering the field anchoring him, making him unstuck again.

In "Eye of the Storm", Geiger has managed to create his own world made out of bits taken from other parallel worlds and has drawn people there to merge with them in an attempt to permanently anchor himself. The Sliders arrive in this world and find Geiger who offers to separate Quinn and Mallory (but says can't do anything for Colin), but really tries to merge himself with Mallory, but is found out and stopped. Afterward, Geiger tries for real to separate the two, but is unable to without killing Mallory as the two have been combined too long so the Sliders decide not to go through with it. A mob storms Geiger's room and he's shot, but before he dies he tells Diana how to send the people home and gives her a small disk, but dies before telling her what it contains. On the next world, Diana looks at it and is shocked by what Geiger has given them: the coordinates of Earth Prime and Diana and Mallory's home world.

=== Logan St. Clair ===
Logan St. Clair played by Zoe McLellan appears in the first episode of season 3 "Double Cross", as one of the chief employees of Prototronics, an unscrupulous wormhole research corporation the Sliders become involved with. She is later discovered to be a gender-flipped fraternal double of Quinn Mallory; her mother remarried, and she took on her step-father's name. She intended to use the Sliders to perfect her technology and use it to raid parallel worlds to steal their resources as the world she lived on was losing them because of the vast technological development. She is discovered to have murdered her Earth's version of Professor Arturo, who invented Sliding on her world. The Sliders make an attempt to escape, but they found she had the ability to track wormholes. She would then threaten Wade before Quinn programmed her timer to enter into a wormhole with a random destination. She was intended to be a recurring antagonist for the season, but was never reused (Angus Rickman instead claims the distinction of being the series first continuing villain). However, because of the encounter with her, the original Timer, which was once bound to the San Francisco area, now had a larger radius of anywhere between there and Los Angeles.

On Lipchitz world, Quinn would mention that he met her in order to get onto "Lipchitz Live" but could never give a straight answer when asked if he had sex with her.

=== The Kromagg Dynasty ===
A race of Sliding marauders dedicated to the conquest of all earths and the systematic genocide of the human race. When first encountered by the original group they had ape-like faces, top knot hair and were armed with handheld laser weapons. Reportedly they are a race of Kromagnon from prehistoric times that on Earth Prime were wiped out in place of humanity, on their world humanity was either wiped out or in a constant war with them.

They have airships called "Manta" that are made with living metal and Slide-capable in addition to holding prisoners in place with a gravitational device.

The history of the Kromagg Dynasty has varied in every season. In Season 2 they allegedly wiped out or subjugated humanity on their earth which had large trees bigger than Sequoa's. Telepathic human slaves were kept in cages and called upon for interrogation of prisoners. The Kromaggs own mental abilities were superior to humans as Professor Arturo once thought he was speaking to Rembrandt before the real Rembrandt walked into his holding cell.

In season 3 it was also told that the double of Quinn Mallory who provided Quinn with the equation for Sliding gave it also to the Kromaggs resulting in the destruction of his own earth, family, and friends leaving him in a self-imposed exile on a parallel earth that treated him like a god.

In season 4 The Kromaggs Image changed to resemble more of a Gestapo military force. Their origin had changed again in that on their homeworld they were driven from their world by the collective efforts of scientists working under Michael Mallory who developed a weapon that only worked against the Kromaggs. This weapon was the goal in Season 4 to get them off of Earth Prime which was overrun with the Kromaggs. The Weapon in question had also made Kromagg to Kromagg procreation difficult since now the Kromagg Female died days after giving birth. This necessitated the need to cross breed with human women who were taken away to breeding camps, one of which Wade Wells was abducted away too. The "Hu-Mag" children were also taken away to deadly training grounds to hunt down captured humans for a chance to enter the "elite" squads. Entry into "Kromagg Prime" was also near impossible thanks to a "Slidecage" that blocked all attempted trans-dimensional travelers from entering.

In season 5 it was discovered that the weapon (later called a "Vorton" device) that was supposed to only affect Kromaggs also destroyed the ecosystem on Kromagg Prime, leaving its use impractical. However other parallel worlds were beginning to develop germ cultures that only affected Kromaggs leaving the Kromaggs unable to continue a conquest of their worlds.

By the end of the series it was left unknown how the Kromagg invasion of Earth Prime had concluded.

=== Kolitar ===
Played by Reiner Schöne was a particular Kromagg the Sliders ran into twice on their travels. He was first encountered at the Slidecage, a device that trapped Inter-dimensional travelers who were trying to gain entrance into Kromagg Prime. He led a faction of Kromaggs who were trapped there in a constant war with humans who were trapped with them. He had raised a human child and taught him mental techniques but kept his face covered after being labeled a "Hideous Mutation". Kolitar uncovered a secret mental command that was implanted in Rembrandt to kill Quinn on command. After failing in the attempt to use it he and his faction were sent away from the Slidecage to random parts unknown.

The next time he was encountered was on a world where California was still in the Old West. He led a gang of land rustlers under the alias of "Mister K" in an effort to perpetuate a scheme to turn California into a gambling capital that would rival Las Vegas. When the Sliders came to that earth he panicked under the impression that they followed him there, and using a psychic Kromagg trick he framed Quinn for murder. He was stopped after a showdown between himself and Colin who was quicker with a gun than he was. He lives through the confrontation but rode off away from town defeated.

== A ==
- Jay Acovone in "Sole Survivors", "Way Out West", and "Eye of the Storm"
- Reba Shaw Alexander in "The Exodus", "My Brother's Keeper", and "A Current Affair"
- Karen Austin in "Eggheads" and "Way Out West"
- Leah Ayres

== B ==
- Obba Babatundé
- Adrienne Barbeau
- Marshall Bell
- Julie Benz as Jenny Michener in "Electric Twister Acid Test"
- David Birney
- Meredith Bishop as Jenny Anderson in "The Dying Fields"
- Ben Bodé as Prince Harold III in "Prince of Wails"
- Bill Bolender
- Katy Boyer
- Charlie Brill
- Julie Caitlin Brown as Kromagg officer in "Requiem"
- Michelle Burke

== C ==
- Veronica Cartwright in "The Fire Within"
- Garry Chalk
- Tommy Chong as Van Elsinger in "Stoker"
- Melinda Clarke as Alisandra in "This Slide of Paradise"
- Roger Cross
- Robert Curtis-Brown
- Charles Cyphers

== D ==
- Anthony David in "Stoker", "Slidecage", and "A Current Affair"
- John DeMita
- James Denton
- Clinton Derricks-Carroll as the double of Rembrandt Brown in "The King is Back", "Greatfellas", and "The Prince of Slides".
- Michael Dobson
- Roy Dotrice as Chandler in "Data World" and Mark in "The Seer"
- Jerry Doyle

== E ==
- Rodney Eastman
- Robert Englund
- Sibel Ergener

== F ==
- Corey Feldman as Reed Michener in "Electric Twister Acid Test"
- Neil Flynn
- Sean Flynn-Amir
- Constance Forslund
- Meg Foster as Margaret Burke in "Slide by Wire"
- Stuart Fratkin

== G ==
- Dan Gauthier
- Rebecca Gayheart as Natalie Nassau in "Time Again and World"
- George Gaynes
- Burton Gilliam
- Danso Gordon
- Groovio off-screen character, only mentioned; a Mexican magician; they had to cross an invisible bridge to get to his house
- Francis Guinan

== H ==
- Jerry Hardin
- Isaac Hayes as the Prime Oracle in "Obsession"
- Rachel Hayward
- Sandra Hess as Marda in "Genesis"
- Jennifer Hetrick in "Last Days" and "The Seer"
- Lawrence Hilton-Jacobs
- Sherman Howard

== J ==
- Robert Jayne
- Don Jeffcoat
- Ken Jenkins in "Revelations" and "Dust"
- Ben Jones

== K ==
- John Kassir
- Apollonia Kotero

== L ==
- Rob LaBelle
- Deborah Lacey
- Lisa Lackey
- Clayton Landey
- Brooke Langton
- Fredric Lehne
- Dawnn Lewis in "The Breeder"
- Barry Livingston
- Kristanna Loken
- Brad Loree

== M ==
- Stephen Macht in "Common Ground" and "New Gods for Old"
- Chase Masterson as Kelly Welles in "Season's Greedings"
- Danny Masterson as Renfield in "Stoker"
- Chuck McCann
- Kathleen McClellan as Erica/Shauna Aldohn in "State of the A.R.T."
- Paul McGillion
- Zoe McLellan as Logan St. Clair in "Double Cross"
- Michael McMillian
- Brian McNamara
- Jim Metzler
- Gabrielle Miller
- Deanna Milligan
- Eddie Mills as Deric in "State of the A.R.T."
- Judson Mills
- Jeffrey Dean Morgan as Sid in "El Sid"
- Don Most as Skip Collins in "Dead Man Sliding"
- Lochlyn Munro as Billy "The Kid" Gates in "The Good, the Bad, and the Wealthy"

== N ==
- Stephanie Niznik
- Rae Norman

== O ==
- Walter Olkewicz as The Boss in "World Killer"

== P ==
- Barry Pepper
- Gina Philips
- Eric Pierpoint
- Gerard Plunkett as Father Jerry in "Gillian of the Spirits" and "Prince of Wails"
- David Purdham

== Q ==
- Anthony Tyler Quinn in "The Fire Within"

== R ==
- Perrey Reeves
- J. August Richards as Damon in "Just Say Yes"
- Robin Riker
- Marco Rodríguez

== S ==
- Harry Shearer
- Liz Sheridan
- Skip Stellrecht
- Ken Steadman

== T ==
- Marshall R. Teague in "The Dying Fields", "Way Out West", and "Heavy Metal"
- Tim Thomerson
- Mel Tormé as himself in "Greatfellas"
- Shaun Toub
- Paula Trickey
- Connor Trinneer as Simon in "Prophets and Loss"

== V ==
- Phillip Van Dyke
- Randy Vasquez

== W ==
- Gwynyth Walsh
- Joseph Wapner
- Zack Ward in "The Dream Masters"
- Malcolm-Jamal Warner as R.J. in "My Brother's Keeper"
- Michael Warren
- Ed Wasser
- Shane West
- Karen Witter
- Nicholas Worth
- Adam Wylie

== Y ==
- Michael York as Dr. Vargas in "This Slide of Paradise"
- Carl Gabriel Yorke in "Common Ground", "California Reich", and "The Return of Maggie Beckett"
- Rob Youngblood in "Paradise Lost" and "The Great Work"
