= List of Sliders episodes =

The following is a list of episodes for the Fox and Sci Fi Channel original series Sliders. The series aired on Fox from March 1995 to May 1997 and on the Sci Fi Channel from June 1998 to February 2000. A total of 88 episodes were produced.

== Series overview ==
Season	Episodes	Originally released		
Season	Episodes	First released	Last released	Network
1	10	March 22, 1995	May 17, 1995	Fox
2	13	March 1, 1996	July 12, 1996	Fox
3	25	September 20, 1996	May 16, 1997	Fox
4	22	June 8, 1998	April 23, 1999	Sci-Fi Channel
5	18	June 11, 1999	February 4, 2000	Sci-Fi Channel

== Episodes ==
=== Season 1 (1995) ===
Fox changed the intended order of the episodes, beginning with episodes they thought would draw in audiences. This often causes confusion and sometimes chronological errors in continuity with respect to the story arc (for example, episode 5 "Prince of Wails" opens with the resolution to the cliffhanger brought about in episode 6 "Summer of Love").

No. overall	No. in season	Title	Directed by	Written by	Original release date	Prod. code
1	1	"Pilot"	Andy Tennant	Story by : Robert K. Weiss; Story and teleplay by : Tracy Tormé	March 22, 1995	83584
2	2	"Pilot"	Andy Tennant	Story by : Robert K. Weiss; Story and teleplay by : Tracy Tormé	March 22, 1995	83584
While researching anti-gravity, brilliant grad student Quinn Mallory accidentally opens an inter-dimensional portal which sends him and three companions on a cosmic roller-coaster ride to parallel Earths, including a world where the Soviet Union conquered America.: Note: Originally shown as a feature-length pilot TV movie, which was later cut into two separate episodes for syndication.
3	5	"Fever"	Mario Azzopardi	Ann Powell & Rose Schacht	March 29, 1995	70402
When Wade is infected with a deadly pathogen on an Earth racked by an epidemic where Quinn's double is Patient Zero, Rembrandt and Arturo race to find a cure and free Quinn from a Gestapo-like health agency.
4	6	"Last Days"	Michael Keusch	Dan Lane	April 5, 1995	70404
The salvation of a world facing destruction by an asteroid rests in the hands of Arturo and Conrad Bennish, an overzealous young scientist with questionable ambitions. Meanwhile, Quinn and Wade begin to face their feelings for each other. Rembrandt learns a moral lesson.
5	4	"Prince of Wails"	Félix Alcalá	Lee Goldberg & William Rabkin	April 12, 1995	70403
In a world where Great Britain successfully suppressed the American Revolutionary War, the Sliders are embroiled in an assassination plot involving the heir to the throne and an evil Sheriff of San Francisco who happens to be the Professor's double.
6	3	"Summer of Love"	Mario Azzopardi	Tracy Tormé	April 19, 1995	70401
The Sliders find themselves in a present-day San Francisco where the "Summer of Love" never ended—and Wade and Rembrandt are mistaken for extraterrestrial prophets. Oliver North is said to be President of the United States in this universe. Quinn and the Professor work to repair a malfunctioning timer as they are accused of a plot to assassinate The President.
7	8	"Eggheads"	Timothy Bond	Story by : Jacob Epstein; Story and teleplay by : Scott Smith Miller	April 26, 1995	70405
In a world where intellectuallism rather than athleticism is regarded as the most prestigious talent, Quinn struggles with fame when he is eligible to compete in the Mindgame Tournament. Arturo tries for a reconciliation with the double of his late wife. Quinn's dilemma is further complicated when he realizes his double has run up considerable gambling debts with gangsters.
8	7	"The Weaker Sex"	Vern Gillum	Dawn Prestwich & Nicole Yorkin	May 3, 1995	70406
Arturo finds himself in a mayoral race in a world where men are treated as "the weaker sex" and women hold the positions of power and influence. Hillary Clinton is shown as being the President of the United States. Arturo considers missing the slide if he should win.
9	9	"The King Is Back"	Vern Gillum	Tracy Tormé	May 10, 1995	70408
Rembrandt is mistaken for his double, a long-missing rock legend presumed deceased, on a world where he was just as popular as Elvis Presley. His double's manager wants him to stay for a high-paying comeback gig, but an old enemy would like to see the Cryin' Man disappear again—permanently. Will Rembrandt decide to stay?
10	10	"Luck of the Draw"	Les Landau	Jon Povill	May 17, 1995	70409
The Sliders believe they have slid into utopia, especially after Wade wins the lottery. The prize has a dark lining when they learn this world's government puts lottery winners to a voluntary death to work with a form of population control. Things get more complicated when both Wade and Rembrandt get romantically involved with volunteers.

=== Season 2 (1996) ===
As in Season 1, Fox again broadcast the episodes out of their intended order, this time even changing the finale. For the intended order of the episodes, see No. in season column.

No. overall	No. in season	Title	Directed by	Written by	Original release date	Prod. code
11	1	"Into the Mystic"	Richard Compton	Tracy Tormé	March 1, 1996	K0807
On an Earth immersed in occult practices, Quinn becomes the target of a shaman who demands his brain as payment for services rendered. A local Sorcerer may have the key to bringing the Sliders home.
12	4	"Love Gods"	John McPherson	Tony Blake & Paul Jackson	March 8, 1996	K0803
Quinn, Rembrandt and Arturo are tagged as runaway breeders on a world where, due to a biological weapon outbreak, men are scarce and nations are in cutthroat competition to snag fertile men to repopulate.
13	7	"Gillian of the Spirits"	Paris Barclay	Tony Blake & Paul Jackson	March 15, 1996	K0810
The Vortex is struck by lightning resulting in Quinn becoming lost in the astral plane, and the only person who can possibly help him is a girl with paranormal abilities. The world they've landed on is constrained by "anti-technology" laws that resulted from the atomic bombings on Japan, crimping Arturo's efforts to repair the timer. Their only hope is help from the Double of Quinn's late father Michael Mallory, but can he be trusted?
14	5	"The Good, the Bad and the Wealthy"	Oscar L. Costo	Scott Smith Miller	March 22, 1996	K0805
Quinn's fast draw with a gun embroils him in a corporate takeover on a world where California is part of the independent Republic of Texas, and securities law allows gunfighting.
15	3	"El Sid"	Paris Barclay	Jon Povill	March 29, 1996	K0802
Quinn rescues a woman on a war-torn world, and her boyfriend, swearing vengeance, jumps the slide. They end up on an earth where San Francisco is a citywide prison that awaits a violent earthquake.
16	2	"Time Again and World"	Vern Gillum	Jacob Epstein	April 5, 1996	K0801
On a world where the United States Constitution has been outlawed, the sliders attempt to preserve the world's final copy of the document and save an activist judge from public execution.
17	11	"In Dino Veritas"	Oscar L. Costo	Steve Brown	April 26, 1996	K0813
The sliders are confused with animal poachers when they land on a world where San Francisco is a preserve for dinosaurs and the Timer is dropped somewhere in the wilderness. Quinn goes missing while in search of the lost Timer.
18	10	"Post Traumatic Slide Syndrome"	Adam Nimoy	Nan Hagan	May 3, 1996	K0812
The sliders believe they have returned home. While Wade and Rembrandt get ready to move on, Quinn quickly has doubt upon noticing extremely minor details being different. Arturo undergoes an unexpected change of character as he takes the credit for inventing Sliding.
19	8	"Obsession"	Colin Bucksey	Story by : Steve Brown; Story and teleplay by : Jon Povill	May 24, 1996	K0808
The sliders land on a world dominated by psychics. The Prime Oracle (who is the most powerful person in the world due to his psychic powers) falls in love with Wade and attempts to keep her from sliding.
20	12	"Greatfellas"	Allan Eastman	Story by : Sean Clark; Story and teleplay by : Scott Smith Miller	May 31, 1996	K0804
Rembrandt is confused with his double on a world where Prohibition was never repealed and gangs dominate society. He discovers his counterpart is a federal agent. The Group must find a way to return bribe money, as they become mixed up in a political conspiracy. (Guest appearance by Mel Torme)
21	13	"The Young and the Relentless"	Richard Compton	Story by : Michael X. Fernaro; Story and teleplay by : T. Edward Anthony & Von Whisenhant	June 7, 1996	K0814
Quinn is forced to impersonate his recently deceased double on a world where the young dominate society and middle-aged people are prohibited from working and are subject to curfews. Rembrandt and the Professor are caught up in the lazy legal system that threatens to send them to jail.
22	9	"Invasion"	Richard Compton	Tracy Tormé	June 28, 1996	K0809
The group arrives on a new world in the middle of an alien invasion, and learn that the invaders are the Kromaggs, a highly technologically advanced and mentally superior race who are sliders that can move through the gateways at will. The group slide to a world where California was settled by the French, where they are captured. They are relocated to Earth 113, and suffer psychic and psychological interrogation.
23	6	"As Time Goes By"	Richard Compton	Steve Brown	July 12, 1996	K0806
The sliders get involved with doubles of the same group of people on three different worlds, including the double of Dalen a high school girlfriend of Quinn. In one of the worlds, time is moving in the opposite direction, causing them to be in prison for her murder, then taken to their arraignment before being set free.

=== Season 3 (1996–1997) ===
Again, Fox aired this season's episodes out of order. For instance, "Double Cross" was filmed as the premiere for Season Three. In this episode, the audience learns why the Sliders will now be able to slide anywhere between San Francisco and L.A. However, Fox opted to air "Rules of the Game" first, since it was a more action-oriented episode. For the intended order of the episodes, see No. in season column. The broadcast viewing order is as follows:

No. overall	No. in season	Title	Directed by	Written by	Original release date	Prod. code
24	2	"Rules of the Game"	Oscar L. Costo	Josef Anderson	September 20, 1996	K1805
The sliders land in the middle of a real live-action war game. This becomes difficult after the Professor gets blinded. Quinn elects to finish the game as a promise to a contestant who is killed before giving the prize money to her family.
25	1	"Double Cross"	Richard Compton	Tony Blake & Paul Jackson	September 27, 1996	K1801
Quinn offers to assist a scientist named Logan St. Claire (Zoe McLellan), who happens to be his female double on this Earth, fix her sliding technology in exchange for using the equipment to find his home coordinates. However, Arturo later discovers Logan does not have good intentions for the use of sliding technology. Rembrandt gets mixed up with his double's "biggest fan".
26	4	"Electric Twister Acid Test"	Oscar L. Costo	Scott Smith Miller	October 4, 1996	K1809
The sliders land in a barren wasteland with bizarre electrical activity that attracts tornadoes. They are confronted by a community that are opposed to any form of technology, who are similar to Amish people. The chief discovers the Sliders' timer and he decides to keep Wade as hostage; while exiling Quinn, Arturo and Rembrandt.
27	5	"The Guardian"	Adam Nimoy	Tracy Tormé	October 11, 1996	K1803
The sliders land on a world where Ronald Reagan is President. When they see news he is running for reelection and the calendar reads 1996, they realize this is a world akin to Earth Prime, except that all time and progress has been delayed by 12 years. Quinn must convince his double of not committing a serious mistake his younger self made, while coming to terms with an inevitable tragic end for The Professor.
28	6	"The Dream Masters"	Jefery Levy	Teleplay by : Melinda M. Snodgrass; Story by : Scott Smith Miller & Melinda M. Snodgrass	October 18, 1996	K1807
The group arrives on a world where terrorists discovered drugs that can invade people's dreams, and one of them chooses Wade as his next victim. (This is the first of two episodes without a proper sliding scene.)
29	7	"Desert Storm"	Jim Johnston	Matt Dearborn	November 1, 1996	K1810
The sliders become involved in a struggle for control over a woman who can detect water on a desert world. Note: Actor Ken Steadman was killed in an accident during production of this episode.
30	8	"Dragonslide"	David Livingston	Tony Blake & Paul Jackson	November 8, 1996	K1816
A wizard wants to capture Quinn on a world where the Mallory family has magical powers. Rembrandt gets affected by a love potion and starts to proclaim love for Wade. Can they all survive the wrath of The Dragon?
31	9	"The Fire Within"	Jefery Levy	Josef Anderson	November 15, 1996	K1814
Quinn and Arturo communicate with a fire-based lifeform on a world where the oil is in Los Angeles. Wade confesses a secret to Rembrandt.
32	10	"The Prince of Slides"	Richard Compton	Eleah Horwitz	November 22, 1996	K1808
The sliders land on a world where America is a Monarchy and men get pregnant. Rembrandt is mistakenly confused for his double and is impregnated with his double's son, who is the heir to the throne.
33	3	"Dead Man Sliding"	Richard Compton	Nan Hagan	November 29, 1996	K1804
Quinn's double is wanted for murder and Quinn is arrested instead. He is sentenced to death on a rigged trial game show, and the other sliders decide that finding Quinn's double is the only way to save Quinn.
34	11	"State of the Art"	John T. Kretchmer	Teleplay by : Nan Hagan; Story by : Schuyler Kent	December 6, 1996	K1813
On a world where the human population has been replaced with androids, a scientist Professor Alden wants to transplant Quinn and Rembrandt's brains into android hosts, before he goes through a similar procedure.
35	12	"Season's Greedings"	Richard Compton	Eleah Horwitz	December 20, 1996	K1806
The sliders land onto a world dominated by commercialism, and get jobs working in a giant mall in the sky two days before Christmas. They later discover that the workers are basically indentured servants, and Arturo attempts to prevent one worker from abandoning her infant child. Wade connects with the doubles of her Father and Sister who Wade attempts to get away from the owner of the mall. Rembrandt starts to buy loads of Christmas Gifts uncharacteristically.
36	13	"Murder Most Foul"	Jeff Woolnough	David Peckinpah	January 3, 1997	K1815
On a world where Clerical workers are everywhere, Arturo is brainwashed into believing he is a great literary detective named Reginald Doyle (this world's equivalent of Sherlock Holmes). after being deemed as over stressed. A situation deemed serious after someone begins to murder women for real in the style of Jack The Ripper)
37	14	"Slide Like an Egyptian"	Adam Nimoy	Scott Smith Miller	January 17, 1997	K1817
The group lands on a world where Alexander the Great may have failed to overthrow ancient Egypt. As a result, pharaoh rule never fell in Egypt and much of the world are Egyptian colonies. Sliding is allowed, but only for those of royal blood. Doctors experiment with the afterlife and Quinn is an unwilling participant. The others must escape from a pyramid while being hunted by the large scarab beetle after missing the Slide.
38	15	"Paradise Lost"	Jim Johnston	Steven Stoliar	January 31, 1997	K1818
The sliders land on a world where a giant worm eats people and leaves behind the secret to eternal life. After the Professor disappears the group discovers how extensive the nightmare of the cove is about to become.
39	17	"The Exodus: Part 1"	Jim Charleston	Story by : John Rhys-Davies; Teleplay by : Tony Blake & Paul Jackson	February 21, 1997	K1825
When the sliders land on an earth that is about to be destroyed by the radiation of a pulsar, a military unit forces them to help them fix their sliding technology invented by Steven Jensen so they can transport people to a parallel world. Quinn teams up with Captain Maggie Beckett, Jensen's Wife, on a search for the appropriate Earth, and finds the coordinates to Earth Prime. There is someone on the base putting people into comas. Guest starring Roger Daltrey as Colonel Rickman.
40	18	"The Exodus: Part 2"	Jefery Levy	Josef Anderson & Tony Blake & Paul Jackson	February 28, 1997	K1824
Quinn and Maggie find an alternate earth to which they can transport 150 survivors from the previous earth. However, Col. Rickman has a hidden agenda for the survivors. Jensen is shot when he finds that Rickman is the one putting people into comas and an ailing Professor is also murdered by Rickman. Rickman escapes with Jensen's Timer as Maggie joins to get revenge. This was one of the last episode John Rhys-Davies filmed for Sliders. With (The Last Of Eden) being the final episode with him in it.
41	19	"Sole Survivors"	David Peckinpah	Steven Kriozere	March 7, 1997	K1819
Quinn is infected with a bacterium that turns people into zombies, as the group must also get used to their changed circumstances.
42	21	"The Breeder"	Paris Barclay	Eleah Horwitz	March 14, 1997	K1823
Maggie is infected with a parasite that takes control of her body and attempts to find a mate, on a world where organ donors are drafted without choice.
43	16	"The Last of Eden"	Allan Eastman	Josef Anderson	March 28, 1997	K1820
Quinn and Wade get stuck in an underground city. Due to it being broadcast out of sequence a pre-credits scene establishes this episode is being told as a flashback to an earlier slide prior to Arturo's death. Rembrandt learns of Arturo's illness in this episode and Quinn learns of Wade's Desire to have a baby. The episode is inspired by H.G. Wells' story The Time Machine.
44	20	"The Other Slide of Darkness"	Jeff Woolnough	Nan Hagan & Scott Smith Miller	April 11, 1997	K1802
The sliders find Rickman close to a Sulfur Fog on a superstitious world. Quinn is faced with a dark choice by someone from his past he encountered right before Sliding.
45	23	"Slither"	Jim Johnston	Tony Blake & Paul Jackson	April 25, 1997	K1829
On a world where smoking is outlawed, Quinn and Rembrandt are separated from Wade and Maggie after their plane crashes in the jungle. They attempt to reunite by assisting people attempting to capture deadly snakes. Quinn and Maggie learn that they are not the best judge of character when it comes to the opposite sex.
46	24	"Dinoslide"	Richard Compton	David Peckinpah	May 2, 1997	K1827
The sliders return to the world with the 150 survivors from The Exodus to find that it is inhabited by dinosaurs. Rickman attempts to carry out his old plan, and a Dangerous T-Rex is on the loose. Rembrandt reunites with an old friend Malcom Eastman.
47	22	"Stoker"	Jerry O'Connell	Josef Anderson	May 9, 1997	K1826
Wade makes friends with vampire musicians who want to steal the timer. Rickman is in hiding disguised as a priest at a blood bank. Quinn teams up with Van Helsinger as they attempt to kill all the vampires in the band. Credits include Tommy Chong and Danny Masterson.
48	25	"This Slide of Paradise"	Jim Johnston	Nan Hagan	May 16, 1997	K1828
The Sliders pursue Rickman to an island with a scientist "Vargus" who has created a race of human-animal hybrids. The Sliders make a last attempt to return home with Rickman's Timer, but will they all escape? Vargus is played by Michael York (see also The Island of Dr. Moreau). This is the last show in which Sabrina Lloyd is seen.

=== Season 4 (1998–1999) ===
This is the first season to be aired on Sci Fi Channel and from this season on, the episodes were aired in the intended order.

No. overall	No. in season	Title	Directed by	Written by	Original release date	Prod. code
49	1	"Genesis"	Reza Badiyi	David Peckinpah	June 8, 1998	K2801
Three months after being separated from Rembrandt and Wade, Quinn and Maggie return to Earth Prime to find it has been conquered by the Kromaggs. Quinn discovers he is not from Earth Prime, and that he has a brother on a parallel earth.
50	2	"Prophets and Loss"	Mark Sobel	Bill Dial	June 8, 1998	K2805
The sliders land on a world dominated by a religion where people wish to travel to the other side through a vortex. After one of the leaders witnesses the sliders arrive on this earth, and after the sliders learn that people are being killed on this earth instead of transported to a parallel world, the timer is confiscated. Connor Trinneer guest stars.
51	3	"Common Ground"	Reza Badiyi	Chris Black	June 15, 1998	K2810
Maggie saves the life of a Kromagg on a world where Kromaggs are conducting experiments on humans. Quinn learns just how hateful Rembrandt has become after his months in captivity.
52	4	"Virtual Slide"	Richard Compton	Keith Damron	June 22, 1998	K2807
The sliders land on a world where everyone uses virtual reality all the time. Maggie goes under surveillance by those in charge who want to build a Sliding Machine.
53	5	"World Killer"	Reza Badiyi	Marc Scott Zicree	June 29, 1998	K2804
The sliders land on a world where Quinn's double slid the entire population except himself, to a world where the population has doubled.
54	6	"Oh Brother, Where Art Thou?"	David Peckinpah	Story by : Chris Black & David Peckinpah; Teleplay by : Bill Dial & Marc Scott Zicree	July 6, 1998	K2811
Quinn locates his brother Colin on a world significantly less advanced than Earth Prime where the society is similar to that of the Amish. After going to the next world Colin must learn how the modern world works. Charlie O'Connell joins the cast as a regular.
55	7	"Just Say Yes"	Jefferson Kibbee	Richard Manning	July 13, 1998	K2809
Maggie and Colin are given drugs in a society where drug use is mandatory and people can be arrested for non-possession. Quinn and Rembrandt must find a way to escape the authorities, detox and rescue Maggie and Colin.
56	8	"The Alternateville Horror"	David Grossman	Chris Black	July 20, 1998	K2803
On a world of acid rain The Chandler Hotel appears to be haunted, but Quinn has a more scientific explanation for what's happening.
57	9	"Slidecage"	Jerry O'Connell	Marc Scott Zicree	July 27, 1998	K2815
Quinn and Colin attempt to slide to Kromagg Prime but end up in a slidecage designed to prevent the Kromaggs from returning to that earth. The Residents there are split between Human and Kromagg. A dark Kromagg Secret is revealed concerning Rembrandt.
58	10	"Asylum"	Michael Miller	Bill Dial	August 17, 1998	K2813
When Quinn is injured, the only one who can save him is a doctor who has been taught Kromagg healing techniques—but who is also wanted for providing assistance to the Kromaggs. A situation more complicated as Rembrandt has fallen in love with her.
59	11	"California Reich"	Robert M. Williams, Jr.	Scott Smith Miller	August 24, 1998	K2802
The group slides into a California where racism is mainstream and immigrants are treated as slave labor. Rembrandt is arrested for being an "Imaggrant". A danger as Imaggrants are lobotomized as slaves. They must rescue Rembrandt and hinder the election of the Governor who authorized the procedures.
60	12	"The Dying Fields"	David Peckinpah	William Bigelow	August 31, 1998	K2812
The sliders land on a world used as a Kromagg training camp, where Kromaggs hunt humans. Colin is kidnapped and Rembrandt is poisoned by a projectile.
61	13	"Lipschitz Live!"	Jerry O'Connell	Keith Damron	November 30, 1998	K2814
The sliders are separated on a world where in every public place, there is a television set showing a talk show called Lipschitz Live! Quinn becomes a guest on the show to announce his location to the others.
62	14	"Mother and Child"	Helaine Head	Richard Manning	December 7, 1998	K2819
The sliders rescue a human woman and her half-human/half-Kromagg infant son from a Kromagg Breeding Camp. After returning her to her world they must save her son from a virus their world used to defeat the Kromaggs, without handing it to a Krommagg Commander who followed them.
63	15	"Net Worth"	Paul Lynch	Steven Stoliar	January 11, 1999	K2806
The group is separated on a world divided between computer experts and ruthless scavengers. In order to reunite they must assist a couple who have only spoken through the Internet.
64	16	"Slide by Wire"	Robert A. Hudecek	Chris Black	January 18, 1999	K2820
Maggie's double impersonates her and slides with Quinn, Rembrandt, and Colin to a world where technology is regarded alongside witchcraft. Maggie must survive in a world where the airforce links their fighters directly from the brain. Meg Foster guest stars.
65	17	"Data World"	Jerry O'Connell	Joel Metzger	March 19, 1999	K2808
Archibald Chandler of the Chandler Hotel turns the sliders into computer data and makes them follow his wishes. By luck Mac the hacker helps the sliders. Will they get out before the timer runs out, or has it already run out for them?
66	18	"Way Out West"	David Peckinpah	Story by : Jerry O'Connell; Teleplay by : Chris Black	March 26, 1999	K2821
On a world resembling the "Old West", the sliders encounter Kolitar, the Kromagg from "Slidecage". Kolitar frames Quinn for murder then he and Rembrandt face hanging. Their only hope lies with Colin and his frontier experience with guns.
67	19	"My Brother's Keeper"	Reza Badiyi	Doug Molitor	April 2, 1999	K2816
Quinn is mistaken for his double's clone on a world where clones are kept as organ donors. The clone is rescued and hunted by the Michael Mallory of his world who wants to harvest his eyes after Quinn's double goes blind.
68	20	"The Chasm"	Robert A. Hudecek	William Bigelow	April 9, 1999	K2817
The sliders land in a village with technology that drains the sadness of one person through a dark Chasm to make the rest of the villagers happy. The truth of the situation must be found after Rembrandt hurls himself into the Chasm.
69	21	"Roads Taken"	Jerry O'Connell	Story by : Marc Scott Zicree; Teleplay by : Bill Dial	April 16, 1999	K2822
A "bubble universe" envelops Quinn and Maggie, as Rembrandt and Colin attempt to survive a war torn world.
70	22	"Revelations"	Robert M. Williams, Jr.	Story by : Marc Scott Zicree; Teleplay by : Bill Dial	April 23, 1999	K2823
After finding a science fiction novel that resembles the Kromagg Prime's conflict between the humans and Kromaggs, Quinn and Colin hope that the author can help them find Kromagg Prime and meet their birthparents. Cast includes Ken Jenkins, and Jerry Hardin guest stars as science fiction writer, Isaac Clark. Jerry and Charlie O'Connell's last episode.

=== Season 5 (1999–2000) ===
No. overall	No. in season	Title	Directed by	Written by	Original release date	Prod. code
71	1	"The Unstuck Man"	Guy Magar	Story by : Keith Damron & David Peckinpah; Teleplay by : Chris Black & Bill Dial	June 11, 1999	E0801
A scientist named Dr. Oberon Geiger uses Quinn and Quinn's double as guinea pigs for an experiment that combines people and parallel worlds. Colin becomes lost and Quinn ends up merged with his fraternal double. Can Geiger be stopped before he collapses the Multiverse together? Joining the cast is Tembi Locke as Dr. Diana Davis, and Robert Floyd as the 'merged Quinn'.
72	2	"Applied Physics"	David R. Eagle	Chris Black	June 18, 1999	E0804
Diana attempts to separate Quinn and his double, while the combined version experiences violent flashbacks from Quinn's life. Diana comes to a hard lesson about teamwork after Geiger returns to further manipulate her.
73	3	"Strangers and Comrades"	Richard Compton	Keith Damron	June 25, 1999	E0809
The sliders land on a barren wasteland and are forced to participate in a neverending battle with the Kromaggs. What is in the Bunker the humans were assigned to guard with their life?
74	4	"The Great Work"	Reza Badiyi	Robert Masello	July 9, 1999	E0806
The sliders seek assistance from reclusive monks who later refuse to let them leave. The Monks are in a race against time against Raiders who seek to steal the sum of all knowledge on their world.
75	5	"New Gods for Old"	Richard Compton	David Gerrold	July 16, 1999	E0810
Mallory is shot with a laser beam and ends up paralyzed, and looks for help from a group of spiritual healers.
76	6	"Please Press One"	Paul Lynch	William Bigelow	July 23, 1999	E0808
Maggie is kidnapped by a corporate conglomerate and becomes trapped in a credit system that refuses to let her leave.
77	7	"A Current Affair"	David R. Eagle	Steven Stoliar	July 30, 1999	E0805
A tabloid newspaper spreads a rumor that U.S. President Jefferson Williams is having an affair with Maggie, as a plot to cover up a germ warfare plot concerning Switzerland.
78	8	"The Java Jive"	Jeff Woolnough	Jennifer McGinnis & Janet Saunders	August 6, 1999	E0807
The sliders land on a world where caffeine is outlawed. Rembrandt falls for a club singer who wants out of a speakeasy life and holds a secret. Rembrandts Double is a Killer for the Mob.
79	9	"The Return of Maggie Beckett"	Peter Ellis	Chris Black	August 13, 1999	E0812
Maggie is mistaken for her astronaut double and is kidnapped by conspirators. The situation is further complicated when Maggie meets the double of her General Father.
80	10	"Easy Slider"	David Peckinpah	Story by : Jennifer McGinnis & Janet Saunders; Teleplay by : Tim Burns	August 20, 1999	E0813
On a world where gas powered vehicles are outlawed due to the pollution that they generate, Mallory becomes friends with a group of motorcycle riders, and becomes intimately involved with their leader.
81	11	"Requiem"	Paul Lynch	Michael Reaves	September 10, 1999	E0802
Rembrandt receives visions from Wade, who is still in Kromagg captivity, and somehow sending portals to the world she is on.
82	12	"Map of the Mind"	Paul Raimondi	Robert Masello	September 17, 1999	E0811
Diana and Mallory become trapped in a mental institution on a world where creativity is a crime.
83	13	"A Thousand Deaths"	David Peckinpah	Keith Damron	September 24, 1999	E0815
The sliders arrive on a world where the local population participates in deadly arcade simulators. The situation is amiss when the holograms show awareness as they plead for their lives.
84	14	"Heavy Metal"	Guy Magar	Chris Black	October 1, 1999	E0814
The sliders exit a vortex in the middle of the ocean, and must join the crew of a pirate ship in order to get back to California. Maggie becomes intimately involved with the Pirate Leader. (This is the second of two episodes without a proper sliding scene.)
85	15	"To Catch a Slider"	Peter Ellis	Story by : Chris Black; Story and teleplay by : Bill Dial	January 14, 2000	E0816
The sliders must find a gem needed to repair their malfunctioning timer or risk another slide in a dangerous vortex.
86	16	"Dust"	Reynaldo Villalobos	Story by : Chris Black; Teleplay by : Tim Burns & Bill Dial	January 21, 2000	E0817
The group lands on a world that suffered a Cataclysm, a defunct timer is found, and where Rembrandt is regarded as a deity.
87	17	"Eye of the Storm"	David Peckinpah	Story by : Eric Morris; Story and teleplay by : Chris Black	January 28, 2000	E0803
In their final encounter with Dr. Geiger on a world that seems to be imploding, the scientist reveals that he can separate Mallory from his double Quinn. His true motives soon become clear.
88	18	"The Seer"	Paul Cajero	Keith Damron	February 4, 2000	E0818
On a world where the Sliders are worshiped with a television program based on the sliders' adventures, a psychic predicts the sliders' fate; they die in their next slide, and he begs Rembrandt, Maggie, Diana and Mallory to stay. Their timer is destroyed and they have to find another way out, as they obtain a virus that is deadly to Kromaggs, but there's a catch, only one can go, as a Hidden Kromagg sliding machine is damaged and projects a highly unstable Vortex. Rembrandt infects himself with the Kromagg killing virus, and he goes, so that he is the only one to risk death. The episode (and the entire series) ends on a cliffhanger, with the rest of the characters wondering what Rembrandt's fate is.

== Notes ==
- Episode titles for season one were not shown on screen; they come from production scripts, and DVD descriptions.
