= The Compleat Al =

- Written by: Robert K. Weiss; Jay Levey; Hamilton Cloud; Al Yankovic
- Directed by: Jay Levey; Robert K. Weiss
- Starring: "Weird Al" Yankovic
- Music by: Derek Nakamoto; Pat Regan "Weird Al" Yankovic
- Country of origin: United States
- Original language: English

Production
- Producer: Robert K. Weiss
- Cinematography: David Lewis
- Editors: Bruce Austin; John Carroll; Kurt Tiegs
- Running time: 100 minutes
- Budget: $250,000

Original release
- Network: Showtime
- Release: August 7, 1985

The Compleat Al is a mockumentary about the life of "Weird Al" Yankovic, from his birth in 1959, to 1985. It was partially written by Yankovic and directed by Jay Levey. An abbreviated version premiered on August 7, 1985 on the Showtime network before the full film was released on video on September 25, 1985. The title of the film is a parody from the 1982 documentary The Compleat Beatles.

Although it is a mockumentary, it is roughly based on Yankovic's real life. For example, Yankovic was raised in Lynwood, California, and has a degree in architecture from Cal Poly San Luis Obispo. His real-life parents appear in the mockumentary, as does a picture of his real-life childhood house. Because of the mixture of Yankovic's real life and fiction, much of the film's fabricated information was accepted by fans as real, for example, the false information that Yankovic was born in a Saint Vitus hospital (the Catholic patron saint of comedy), or the film's pun which claimed his birth in an elevator signified his "rise to the top."

The mockumentary also contains clips from the first three AL-TV specials, and all of Yankovic's music videos up to 1985: "Ricky", "I Love Rocky Road", "Eat It", "I Lost on Jeopardy", "This Is the Life", "Like a Surgeon", "One More Minute", and "Dare to Be Stupid". It also contains an extended version of “Mr Popeil.”

The parody also extends to the technical aspects of the film, such as the copyright warning message which starts routinely but escalates to warnings that copying the video may result in damage to your VCR, smoke may come out of your TV set, escalating to possible destruction of the planet due to the greed of the viewer.

== Production ==
The film came about when CBS Home Video approached Yankovic to make a long form music video. It was produced by Yankovic's manager Jay Levey, Levey's friend Hamilton Cloud, and Robert K. Weiss, who had previously produced Kentucky Fried Movie and The Blues Brothers. The production, which had a budget of $250,000, also included making videos for "Like a Surgeon", "Dare to Be Stupid", and "One More Minute", which were included in the film. The film, including the music videos, was directed by Levey and Weiss.

== Release ==
The film first premiered on August 7, 1985 on the premium cable channel Showtime, which aired a 60-minute version of the film. The full film was then released on VHS and Betamax on September 25, 1985. The film was later released on Laserdisc in 1986. A 10-minute version of the mockumentary appeared on the sixth AL-TV special, which aired on MTV in 1992.

Shout! Factory released The Compleat Al on DVD for the first time on November 11, 2014.

=== The Authorized Al ===
A book entitled The Authorized Al (ISBN 0-8092-5133-7), written by Yankovic and comedian Tino Insana, was released shortly after the film as a companion piece.
