= John Novak (actor) =

Canadian voice actor

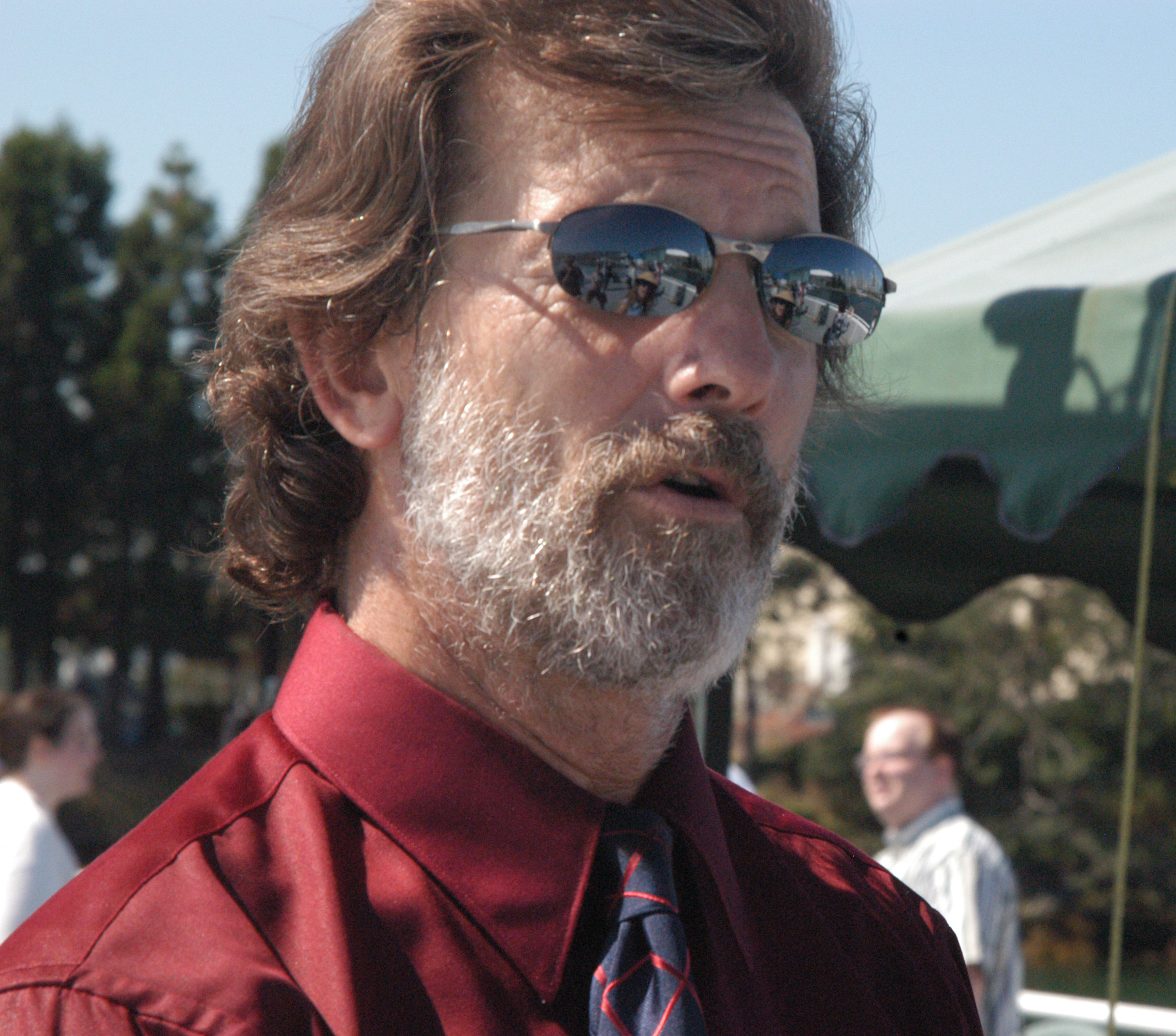
- Novak at the 2005 Gatecon
- Born: Caracas, Venezuela
- Occupation: Actor

John Novak is a Venezuela-born Canadian voice, film and television actor who frequently does work for Ocean Productions based in Vancouver, Canada.

== Biography ==
He was born in Venezuela to Canadian parents who were visiting the country.

He has also starred in the Wishmaster sequels Wishmaster 3: Beyond the Gates of Hell, and Wishmaster: The Prophecy Fulfilled, replacing Andrew Divoff as The Djinn.

He appeared in Street Justice, twice in the TV series Sliders as a shyster lawyer, Ross J. Kelly, and 3 times in Highlander: The Series.

He most recently starred as the Sheriff in Bloodrayne 2: Deliverance.

Novak is probably best known, in Canada at least, from Kokanee beer commercials, as he plays the Park Ranger who is constantly trying to prevent the Kokanee Sasquatch from stealing the beer.

== Filmography ==
- Ayakashi: Samurai Horror Tales – Shuri Odawara, Yoshiaki Sakai
- Barbie: The Pearl Princess – Caligo
- Black Lagoon – Cargo Ship Captain, Sonar Operator
- Black Lagoon: The Second Barrage – Tsugio Bando
- Death Note – Zellogi, Steve Mason
- Doctor Who – Salinger
- Fantastic Four: World's Greatest Heroes – Supreme Intelligence
- Adieu Galaxy Express 999 – Faust
- Ghost in the Shell: Stand Alone Complex – The Laughing Man – Kubota
  - Ghost in the Shell: S.A.C. GIG – Individual Eleven – Kubota
- Gintama° – Katakuriko Matsudaira
- Home Sweet Home Alone – Johnny
- InuYasha – Ungai
- Key the Metal Idol – Jinsaku Ajo
- Kingdom series – Wang Qi
- LEGO Ninjago: Masters of Spinjitzu – Skalidor, Slithraa, Bank Boss, Police Officer, Fangdam
- Level Up – Maldark
- Mobile Suit Gundam: Encounters in Space – Kelly Layzner
- Mobile Suit Gundam SEED – Uzumi Nara Athha
- Mobile Suit Gundam SEED: Never Ending Tomorrow – Uzumi Nara Athha
- Mobile Suit Gundam SEED Destiny – Uzumi Nara Athha
- Santa Barbara – Keith Timmons
- Silent Möbius 2: The Motion Picture – Combined, Old Man, Monster Alpha
- Sliders – Ross J. Kelly
- Smallville – Jed McNally / Gary Bergen
- Stargate SG-1 – Colonel William Ronson (2 episodes)
- Supernatural – Zeus
- Spearfield's Daughter - Alain Roux
- Tara Duncan: The Evil Empress
- The Amazing Zorro – His Excellency, the Governor
- The Condor – George Valdez
- The Little Prince – Marine (The Planet of Ludokaa, then later in The Planet of the Crystal Tears)
- The Story of Saiunkoku – Advisor Yosei Sho, Bandit, General Haku, High Government Official 2, Raien Haku, Visitor
- Thor: Tales of Asgard – Thrym, Additional Voices
- Ultraviolet: Code 044 – Reindeer
- X-Men: Evolution – Bolivar Trask
