= Sliders (TV series) =

American science fiction/fantasy series (1995–2000)

- Genre: Science-fiction; fantasy
- Created by: Tracy Tormé; Robert K. Weiss
- Starring: Jerry O'Connell; Cleavant Derricks; Sabrina Lloyd; John Rhys-Davies; Kari Wuhrer; Charlie O'Connell; Robert Floyd; Tembi Locke
- Theme music composer: Danny Lux
- Composers: Dennis McCarthy; Mark Mothersbaugh; Stephen Graziano; Danny Lux; Anthony Marinelli (season 2); Dennis M. Halligan; Bruce Berman
- Country of origin: United States
- Original language: English
- No. of seasons: 5
- No. of episodes: 88 (list of episodes)

Production
- Executive producers: Tracy Tormé; Robert K. Weiss; John Landis; Leslie Belzberg; Alan Barnette; Bill Dial; David Peckinpah
- Running time: 44 minutes
- Production companies: St. Clare Entertainment; Universal Television

Original release
- Network: Fox
- Release: March 22, 1995 – May 16, 1997
- Network: Sci-Fi Channel
- Release: June 8, 1998 – February 4, 2000

Sliders is an American science-fiction and fantasy television series created by Robert K. Weiss and Tracy Tormé. It was broadcast for five seasons between 1995 and 2000. The series follows a group of travelers as they use a wormhole to "slide" between parallel universes. Robert K. Weiss, Tracy Tormé, Leslie Belzberg, John Landis, David Peckinpah, Bill Dial, and Alan Barnette served as executive producers at different times of the show's production. For its first two seasons, it was produced in Vancouver, British Columbia. It was filmed primarily in Los Angeles, California, in the last three seasons.

The first three seasons were broadcast by Fox. After being canceled by Fox, the series moved to Sci-Fi Channel for its final two seasons. The final episode of Sliders aired on the Sci-Fi Channel in February 2000.

== Plot ==
The original Sliders: From left to right: Wade Welles (Sabrina Lloyd), Rembrandt Brown (Cleavant Derricks), Professor Arturo (John Rhys-Davies), and Quinn Mallory (Jerry O'Connell)

The show's titular characters are a group of people who travel ("slide") between different Earths in parallel universes, via vortex-like wormholes created by a device college student Quinn Mallory invented in the basement of his family house in his spare time, and controlled with the use of a hand-held timer device that informs them of how long they must stay in one universe until they can "slide" into the next one; most of the universes are very different from their home universe, and quite a few of them are deadly. While the slide technology was originally supposed to allow the group to easily return to their home universe, their premature use of the timer to escape a dangerous situation caused the timer to lose track of the coordinates for their home universe.

Now, they are forced to slide between universes, spending varying amounts of time in each parallel universe (at times as short as a few minutes to a day or two, at times weeks or even months), waiting for the timer to count down to the next time they can open a vortex to a new universe with the remote timer, each time hoping it is their original, "home universe". Failing to activate the vortex with the timer at the time the timer indicates to open the vortex in its countdown would mean they would be stuck in whatever universe they were in for nearly three decades until they can open the vortex again. Many of the universes were very dystopic (or worse), some obeyed totally different laws of science, and staying in any of the alternate universes was rarely considered by the main four characters.

While waiting for the timer countdown, the Sliders frequently explore the natures of the alternate universes, and often become caught up in events of that world. Some of these universes are based on alternate timelines in which certain historical events happened differently from the history they know, such as one where penicillin was never discovered, or a world where America had lost the Revolutionary War, while other worlds have entirely novel histories, such as one where time flowed in reverse, or where dinosaurs never became extinct. Yet other worlds are extinct of observeable life, or are close to human extinction thanks to some disaster or apocalyptic event (man-made, scientifically created, or natural).

The main initial cast included Quinn Mallory (Jerry O'Connell), who created the sliding technology; uptight and at times short-tempered Professor Maximillian Arturo (John Rhys-Davies), Quinn's physics professor (and at-times mentor); Wade Welles (Sabrina Lloyd), Quinn's friend, who previously worked in a retail consumer electronics store; and Rembrandt Lee "Cryin' Man" Brown (Cleavant Derricks), a mostly has-been but at one time somewhat famous singer who is accidentally dragged along (along with his classic Cadillac) into their vortex radius during Quinn, Arturo and Wade's first major test of the sliding device (his beloved car essentially a goner as someone as they arrive in the disaster world they slide into on their first slide). Within a few episodes a certain degree of trust has been established amongst the four "Sliders" and "Remmy" and the others eventually become close friends, repeatedly saving one anothers' lives. Many of the episodes involve one or more of the lead characters being tempted into something they should not do, sometimes simply because their home world had no negative repercussions for doing such things, and other times because something in their newfound temporary alternate universe seemed so good (while those from that universe, having no idea they were from a parallel universe, knew the dangers or ramifications and assumed they did as well). Other times, main characters' egos are tested. Sometimes one or more of them just got carried away by seemingly good intentions.

Over the course of five seasons (and two television networks), the show saw some cast member additions, most major cast members' departures, and some main lead characters added to become replacements for departing leads, including Captain Maggie Beckett (Kari Wuhrer), a military officer from one doomed alternate Earth; Colin Mallory (Charlie O'Connell), Quinn's lost brother; a second Quinn Mallory (Robert Floyd) that resulted from the original Quinn inadvertently merging with the Quinn of a world they slid into, and Dr. Diana Davis (Tembi Locke), a scientist who attempts to help them reverse the process. A handful of recurring roles played by the same people as in the original four's home universe, but with little in common with them aside from, quite often, certain personality traits, similar character-syntonic motivations, and intelligence levels.

== Episodes ==
Season	Episodes	Originally released		
Season	Episodes	First released	Last released	Network
1	10	March 22, 1995	May 17, 1995	Fox
2	13	March 1, 1996	July 12, 1996	Fox
3	25	September 20, 1996	May 16, 1997	Fox
4	22	June 8, 1998	April 23, 1999	Sci-Fi Channel
5	18	June 11, 1999	February 4, 2000	Sci-Fi Channel

== Cast ==
=== Main ===
Actor	Character	Seasons				
Actor	Character	1	2	3	4	5
Jerry O'Connell	Quinn Mallory	Main	Main	Main	Main	
Sabrina Lloyd	Wade Welles	Main	Main	Main		Voice
Cleavant Derricks	Rembrandt "Crying Man" Brown	Main	Main	Main	Main	Main
John Rhys-Davies	Professor Maximilian Arturo	Main	Main	Main		
Kari Wuhrer	Capt. Maggie Beckett			Guest	Main	Main
Kari Wuhrer	Capt. Maggie Beckett			Main	Main	Main
Charlie O'Connell	Colin Mallory		Guest (as Kit Richards)	Guest (as Officer O'Hara)	Guest	
Charlie O'Connell	Colin Mallory		Guest (as Kit Richards)	Guest (as Officer O'Hara)	Main	
Robert Floyd	Quinn "Mallory" Mallory					Guest
Robert Floyd	Quinn "Mallory" Mallory					Main
Tembi Locke	Dr. Diana Davis					Guest
Tembi Locke	Dr. Diana Davis					Main

=== Recurring ===
- Angus Rickman (first portrayed by Roger Daltrey for two episodes and then by Neil Dickson for four episodes): A colonel and Maggie's superior officer
- Elston Diggs (portrayed by Lester Barrie): A bartender
- Oberon Geiger (portrayed by Peter Jurasik): Diana's boss
- Amanda Mallory (portrayed by Linda Kaye Henning): Quinn's adoptive mother on Earth Prime
- Michael Mallory (portrayed by John Walcutt): Quinn's father whose Earth Prime version died when Quinn was young
- Gomez Calhoun (portrayed by Will Sasso)
- Pavel Kurlienko (portrayed by Alex Bruhanski): A taxi driver

== Production ==
Michio Kaku explains in the appendix of his book, The Future of the Mind, that the Sliders series began "when a young boy read a book. That book is actually my book Hyperspace, but I take no responsibility for the physics behind that series." Before moving to Sci-Fi Channel each episode of the series cost $1.4 million to $1.5 million.

While filming the episode "Desert Storm", actor Ken Steadman (Cutter) was killed. In an accident that occurred between takes, Steadman moved a dune buggy to the next shooting location. While he was moving the vehicle, the dune buggy overturned and crushed him, killing him instantly. According to Steadman's parents, his death was preventable.

Entering into the fifth season, the production team knew the series was not being renewed, and had saved money from the budget of each season-five episode for use in a climactic battle for the season finale. The money was instead used for the penultimate episode, "Eye of the Storm", while the last episode ended with an unresolved cliffhanger. Insiders have various theories as to why this happened. The producers were concerned the Sci Fi Channel had lost interest in the show (though it was their highest-rated program at the time) after they ceased supplying corrective notes for the episodes, and it was believed they were not even reading the scripts.

One strict rule the Sci Fi Channel had was that a gun could not be pointed at a person's head. To test this rule, executive producer Bill Dial presented a script featuring a character getting his head shot completely off, which was ignored. Dial then presented the script for the final-episode cliffhanger, which was also ignored. Some claim this was done to encourage fans to push for a sixth season, but members of the production team claim that the decision was personal.

Iranian-American director Reza Badiyi is credited with directing a number of the episodes in the fifth season, and his daughter, Mina Badiyi, made a guest appearance in episode three, "Common Ground".

=== Changing cast and crew ===
The main cast by the final season: From left to right: Maggie Beckett (Kari Wuhrer), Rembrandt Brown (Derricks), Dr. Diana Davis (Tembi Locke), and Mallory (Robert Floyd).

Sliders had a turbulent history due to changes in the cast and crew through its run. Cleavant Derricks is the only cast member to stay with the series throughout its entire run. Derricks and Linda Henning (Mrs. Mallory) are the only actors to appear in both the first and last episodes of the series. Derricks' identical twin, Clinton Derricks-Carroll, appeared in the episodes "The King Is Back", "Greatfellas", and "The Prince of Slides", when a need arose for Rembrandt and his double to interact.

==== Third season transitions ====
Jerry O'Connell felt the first two seasons went smoothly, but then a significant shift in creative direction of the series happened with the third season, with the Fox network desiring it to be a more action-oriented show than thought-provoking. John Rhys-Davies was the first star of the series to leave. Rhys-Davies stated in a 2016 interview that he had been critical of how the show was written, calling the concept what "could've been the best show on television", but most of the scripts he had been given were "incomprehensible gibberish" and missed the potential of the concept. He cited that Fox had exerted too much control on the scripts as part of the reason for his departure.

In a 2014 interview at the Toulouse Game Show, Rhys-Davies stated that the inability to get writers who had read science fiction in the first place led to the show's downfall, and their inexperience in the area led to the show often repurposing ideas from other works. He said, "We did an episode like Tremors, one like Twister, one like The Night of the Living Dead, and even one like The Island of Doctor Moreau, using the film's original masks!" He found the writers were just "looting" these ideas rather than using these as a tribute, pointing to one episode in which Quinn needed to cross an invisible bridge, and on approaching the writer about it, discovered he had never seen Indiana Jones and the Last Crusade, in which Rhys-Davies had starred, and simply used the idea instead of toying with the meta nature of the scene.

For Rhys-Davies, "the breaking point for me was when I walked in and saw the writers sitting around looking at a DVD of Species, which had just been released and saying: 'Look, we could take a bit of that scene there and a bit of that scene there.'"

The series co-creator, Tracy Tormé, has often been critical of the direction the series took in the third season. Tormé called the third season two-parter "Exodus" "one of the worst pieces of television ever produced, and the low point of the entire series". David Peckinpah was brought onto the series in the third season (around the time when Tormé started to criticize the show). The last episode to be written by Tormé was K1803, "The Guardian", and the first to be written by Peckinpah was K1815, "Murder Most Foul". Some argue Peckinpah's involvement in the series (and by extension Fox's more hands-on involvement) caused the show to "jump the shark", despite new executive producer Marc Scott Zicree's decision to restore Tracy Tormé's original "alternate history" premise for the series in season four. Tormé, along with co-creators Robert K. Weiss and John Landis, all departed the show during the third season.

Part of Fox's involvement in the third season was to shift production from Vancouver to Los Angeles to reduce filming costs. The recurring characters were dropped due to the expense of flying them from Vancouver to Los Angeles for filming. Bartender Elston Diggs was brought in as a recurring character for six episodes, but Peckinpah eventually rejected the concept. Logan St. Clair was created to be a recurring character, which is evident in the episode's dialogue, but only appeared once. Fox did not believe she was "sexy" enough and requested she not appear again.

==== Cancellation by Fox and pickup by Sci-Fi ====
Fox canceled the show after the third season, but it was later picked up by the Sci-Fi network. Jerry O'Connell felt that Sci-Fi was looking to maintain the action-based show with more emphasis on darker sci-fi elements. Lloyd decided not to return to the series when it was revived, according to her agency.

As a result of public pressure to elaborate on what happened to Wade after she disappeared, the producers asked Lloyd to guest star in one season-five episode that was to focus entirely on Wade (without the rest of the cast). Lloyd requested $40,000 to appear, the same per-episode salary Derricks was receiving and $20,000 more than Wuhrer, and the idea was scrapped. However, the episode in which she was to appear, "Requiem", was "fine-tuned" to answer this question without her. Lloyd ultimately provided voice-overs for the episode, and a stand-in was used.

By the end of the fourth season, Jerry and Charlie O'Connell left the series to pursue film careers. Jerry O'Connell felt that without Lloyd, Rhys-Davies, and Tormé, much of the show's original premise was gone, and opted to leave. The brothers leaving the show upset many fans, and Tracy Tormé was asked what could be done to win them back. This resulted in an unsuccessful effort to bring back some popular, previously recurring characters.

The producers negotiated with John Novak (Ross J. Kelly, the ambulance-chasing lawyer), Alex Bruhanski (Pavel Kurlienko, the taxi driver) and Lester Barrie (Elston Diggs, the waiter at the Chandler Hotel) for their returns in season five. Zoe McLellan (Logan St. Clair) was scheduled to appear again and Jason Gaffney (Conrad Bennish, Jr) from season one was confirmed for four episodes, including the season finale. However, none of these guest stars appeared.

== Broadcast ==
=== Season 1 ===
Quinn, eager to demonstrate his vortex technology to Prof. Arturo and Wade, inadvertently opens a large wormhole that draws Rembrandt with them to a hostile, ice-covered Earth. Quinn is forced to activate the vortex prematurely to save them, and they find themselves unable to return to their Earth. So as not to be stranded on any alternate Earth for over 20 years, the group continues to slide between worlds, many of them involving alternate histories, such as if the British had won the Revolutionary War, or if antibiotics had never been discovered.

=== Season 2 ===
The group continues to slide between alternate Earths, exploring further alternate timelines and more fantastical variations from the Earth they know. On one slide, they encounter the Kromaggs, an alien species that have perfected sliding and use it to strip resources from alternate earths. The Kromaggs become aggressively curious about Quinn's technology.

=== Season 3 ===
As they continue to slide, hoping to return to their prime dimension, the Sliders land on an Earth that is doomed by a passing pulsar, they provide a means to evacuate a small portion of its population to a safe dimension; however, the exodus is betrayed by a new enemy in Colonel Rickman, who needs brain fluid to survive a disease he obtained in a gulf war. While protecting Quinn, Prof. Arturo sacrifices himself. The group, now joined by Captain Maggie Beckett, pursues Rickman to acquire a timer he stole with Earth Prime's location saved into it. While Wade and Rembrandt make it back, Quinn and Maggie end up stuck on another alternate Earth.

=== Season 4 ===
Quinn and Maggie find a way to return to Earth Prime, but they find it taken over by the Kromaggs; they are able to rescue Rembrandt, but not Wade. Quinn's mother tells him he is actually adopted, born from parents that knew of sliding technology and used it to hide him from the Kromaggs. She also tells him where to find his brother, Colin, who then joins the Sliders. The group continues to slide, hoping to find a means to deal with the Kromaggs on Earth Prime and in other dimensions.

=== Season 5 ===
In what at first appears to be a freak sliding accident, Quinn merges with the Quinn of the dimension into which they have slid, merging them into "Mallory", while Colin is lost to the vortex, as explained to them by Dr. Diana Davis, a scientist studying transdimensional travel. She later slides with Mallory, Maggie, and Rembrandt as they continue to search for a way to stop the Kromaggs. Ultimately, they discover a contagious virus, deadly to Kromaggs. After the timer is destroyed, they find they can send one slider back to Earth Prime. Rembrandt injects himself with the virus and jumps through, leaving the three unsure of his fate.

=== Broadcast order ===
The Fox Network aired certain episodes from seasons one and two in a different order from originally scripted to best capitalize on potential ratings-winning episodes, thus causing some continuity errors. For instance, the timer is first set to count down not in the pilot episode, but in "Summer of Love"—since Fox aired "Fever" right after the pilot episode, though many viewers were left confused as to why the Sliders suddenly had to leave within a very specific period of time. Similarly, the cliffhanger at the end of "Summer of Love" leads directly into the opening of "Prince of Wails", which Fox had actually aired a week earlier.

For season two, Fox did not want to resolve the cliffhanger at the end of "Luck of the Draw", preferring to focus, instead, on brand-new storylines. Thus, in "Time Again and World" (the first episode filmed for season two), Arturo makes a brief passing reference to the events of "Luck of the Draw". This missed cliffhanger was particularly significant, as the episode had ended with Quinn being shot in the back. Tracy Tormé successfully petitioned for a chance to resolve the cliffhanger, though, which is briefly dealt with in the opening minutes of "Into the Mystic" (the third episode filmed, but the first to air that season), where the life-threatening wound is now merely a flesh wound in his shoulder, allowing for a quick recovery. "Time Again and World" ended up airing sixth in the rotation.

"Double Cross" was filmed as the premiere for season three. In this episode, the audience learns why the Sliders would now be able to slide anywhere between San Francisco and Los Angeles. Fox opted to air "Rules of the Game" first, since it was a more action-oriented episode.

"The Last of Eden" was filmed before John Rhys-Davies left the show. Fox chose to air the episode for the first time on March 28, a full month after Arturo had been written off the show, requiring a new opening scene be added to frame the story as a flashback.

When the show began airing in reruns on the Sci Fi Channel, Sci Fi restored the original filmed order for season one. When the DVDs were released, Universal used the aired order for all seasons.

== Home media ==
Universal Studios Home Entertainment has released all five seasons on DVD in Regions 1, 2, and 4. The fifth and final season was released in Region 1 on January 17, 2012, almost four years after season four.

On December 2, 2014, Universal released Sliders- The Complete Series on DVD in Region 1. This set contains all 88 episodes of the series on 22 single-sided discs with a runtime of 66 hours (3954 minutes).

On July 1, 2016, Mill Creek Entertainment announced it had acquired the rights to the series in Region 1 and would re-release the complete series on DVD on October 4, 2016. The 15-disc set contains all five seasons of the series in correct story order.

DVD Name	Ep#	Release dates		
DVD Name	Ep#	Region 1	Region 2	Region 4
The First and Second Seasons	23	August 3, 2004	December 27, 2004	May 2, 2005
The Third Season	25	July 19, 2005	October 31, 2005	February 8, 2006
The Fourth Season	22	March 25, 2008	May 19, 2008	June 4, 2008
The Fifth and Final Season	18	January 17, 2012	March 13, 2009 (Germany)	June 5, 2013
The Complete Series	88	December 2, 2014; October 4, 2016 (Re-Release)	N/A	November 6, 2013; November 13, 2019 (Re-Release)

=== Streaming ===
On August 23, 2007, Netflix Instant View started providing all five seasons of Sliders available for streaming. Two season-one episodes ("Last Days" and "The Weaker Sex") are missing, with a note in their place stating that the DVD is required to view the episode. The first episode, "Pilot", is available both as one combined episode, and as two separate parts, "Pilot Part 1" and "Pilot Part 2". All episodes of the remaining seasons are available for streaming.

On March 12, 2008, Universal Studios added Sliders season one to their streaming service, Hulu (then a free ad-supported streaming service before 2016). Season two was added on May 8, 2009, and season three was added on July 2, 2009.

In late 2008, season five and eventually all five seasons were made available through iTunes TV Shows store.

In August 2020, all episodes were available with free version of Peacock, although the pilot episode was split into two roughly 45-minute segments. The series was originally mistakenly listed as "Drama" rather than "Sci-Fi", but that was corrected within a month. As of February 2023, the series was no longer available for free on Peacock TV after all episodes were moved to pay to view, then left on June 30, 2026.

On July 1, 2026, the free ad-supported streaming television (FAST) service Tubi (owned by Fox Corporation, the parent company of the Fox television network) added all five seasons of the series for free streaming.

=== 2025 cast reunion ===
On September 27, 2025, Jerry O'Connell, John Rhys-Davies, and Cleavant Derricks reunited for the first time since the series finale at FanX Salt Lake Comic Convention, participating in a 45-minute panel, photo ops, and autographs.

Absent was Sabrina Lloyd due to family commitments in Europe. The panel credited creator Tracy Tormé (d. 2023) for early science-driven episodes while critiquing later seasons' Kromagg focus.

All three affirmed reboot interest. Rhys-Davies reiterated his multi-season plan: regroup originals, test new talent/characters, phase out the original Sliders (Quinn, Arturo, Rembrandt, etc.) characters. Derricks envisioned a solo "bum" arc before reunion; O'Connell pledged promotion. Favorites: "Eggheads," "The King Is Back." The event reignited fan discussions.

== Future ==
Interest in reviving Sliders has persisted among its cast and creators since at least the mid‑2010s. In a 20th‑anniversary interview published in 2015, Jerry O'Connell said that any potential revival should be led by co‑creator Tracy Tormé, stating, "Tracy Tormé is the guy to talk to. I am in if he is. That is the creator and boss. I go where he tells me." O'Connell later reiterated that Tormé had personally contacted him about "thinking about rebooting Sliders", adding that he would be "in" if it moved forward.

At Toronto Comicon in March 2019, John Rhys‑Davies told fans that he and O'Connell were "talking to NBC at the moment" about a possible revival, while noting that the main obstacle was uncertainty over who currently held the rights to the series. Follow‑up reporting described NBC as considering the viability of a revival and confirmed that questions over ownership among Fox, the Sci‑Fi Channel (now Syfy), and NBCUniversal complicated any deal. In 2024 and 2025, O'Connell again discussed ideas for a revival, telling Syfy that he would like to revisit the premise with new technology and stories while only committing to "a season or two" if the project felt right.

Co‑creator Tracy Tormé confirmed in 2021 that work on a reboot was "actively" underway. During an appearance on the YouTube program Masters of the Genre, he said, "We're right in the middle of rebooting it right now as we speak", adding that his goal was to avoid a "politically correct" or "safe" version of the series.

Tormé died on January 4, 2024, from complications of diabetes, at the age of 64. Subsequent retrospectives and interviews have noted that former cast members including O'Connell and Rhys‑Davies remain open to returning if a revival honoring the show's original, idea‑driven premise can be mounted, but as of 2026 no new series has entered production.

== Connection to other works ==
=== Doorways ===
The plotlines in Sliders are all set around the idea of a multiverse, where the outcomes of nondeterministic quantum processes result in the splitting of reality into multiple universes, each existing in parallel. Also, speculation had arisen that Sliders was inspired by George R. R. Martin's 1992 ABC pilot Doorways, in which the main cast were fugitives fleeing through parallel worlds, while carrying a device that tells them where and when the next doorway opens.

Although scripts for six additional episodes after the pilot film were completed, Doorways never went to series, as ABC decided to launch Lois & Clark: The New Adventures of Superman instead in the fall of 1993. At the time of the Sliders' launch, Evelyn C. Leeper noted the similarities to Doorways, and in response to rumors that Sliders creator Tracy Tormé applied for a writing position on the show, Martin clarified in a 1995 post on GEnie that it was Tormé's agent who inquired about the position, and Tormé has denied any connection between the two.

== Sliders in other media ==
=== Sliders-branded works ===
- The pilot episode of Sliders was novelized by science-fiction writer Brad Linaweaver, and was released in the spring of 1996, one year after the series originally premiered. Linaweaver's novelization incorporates several deleted scenes from the original pilot episode production script, along with Linaweaver's own additions to the plot.
- Linaweaver also later compiled an episodic guide to the show, Sliders: The Classic Episodes, which contained information only on seasons one through three.
- Dennis McCarthy produced a Sliders soundtrack in 2007, with complete scores to both the episodes from the first season he scored, which included the pilot. As of late 2010, no other scoring from the series' other composers has been released.
- Sliders was also spun off into a 10-issue comic-book series published by Acclaim Comics in 1996. This series had no direct input from series creators Tormé or Weiss, but Tormé did pass along several notes detailing stories that went unproduced. Series star Jerry O'Connell also personally authored one special issue of this comic series. While advertised and solicited for advance order, the 11th and final Sliders comic, titled Get a Life, never made it to store shelves, but artist Rags Morales completed art for 14 pages of the comic before production was stopped.
- Sliders trading cards, produced by Inkworks in 1997, consisted of 90 cards, including nine embossed cards, six foil cards combining to make a large portrait of the Kromagg homeworld, two lenticular cards, and one promotional card by the Official Sliders Fan Club.

=== References by others ===
- After the changes of the 1994 DC Comics miniseries Zero Hour: Crisis in Time!, the artistic design of time travel was changed and first introduced in Legion of Super-Heroes #74. During the issue, Superboy comments that this design is similar to the tunnel effect on Sliders. The new design was used by DC Comics from the 1995 debut through to its last appearance in 2005 in the Teen Titans/Legion Special.
- In the December 19, 1996 FoxTrot strip by Bill Amend, Frosty the Snowman condemns Paige for watching Sliders instead of his own Christmas television special.
- In 1997, the Desktop Images production company released a training video on the subject of Organic Modeling and Animation hosted by David Lombardi. The video gave a behind-the-scenes look at the special effects process used in the Sliders season three episodes "Paradise Lost" and "Dinoslide".
- Marvel's Exiles features several Marvel characters who have been pulled from their own realities to fix problems in alternate ones. Series creator Judd Winick has stated that Sliders was an inspiration for the series.
- Released February, 2005, Marvel Knights 4 issue 15 features the Human Torch fondly remembering Sliders as the fantastic team prepares to embark on a time travel mission.
- The September 14, 2007 issue of online comic VG Cats (#243: Bizzaro!) features Leo mentioning Sliders, followed by a scene in a parallel universe into which the original line-up (Rembrandt, Arturo, Quinn and Wade) slide. The timer states they are there for three years.
- Funny or Die featured an April Fool's sketch where O'Connell tried to crowdfund a Sliders movie.
- Jerry O'Connell appears as Lancelot in an episode of the series The Librarians, which featured alternate Earths.
- The Family Guy episode "Road to the Multiverse", which features Brian Griffin and Stewie Griffin traveling through various parallel universes, was originally going to be called "Sliders".
- In the Family Guy episode "Bend Or Blockbuster", Peter Griffin rents a VHS tape of Sliver, but finds the second season of Sliders in the case instead.
