= Lester Barrie =

American comedian (born 1965)

- Born: Lester Eugene Barrie; October 1, 1965 (age 61)
- Occupation: Comedian

Lester Barrie (born October 1, 1965) is an American professional stand-up comedian, who has made appearances as a movie and television actor.

Lester Barrie is currently makes stand-up comedy appearances at the Comedy and Magic Club in Hermosa Beach, California as well as other clubs, colleges, churches and corporate events around the country.

== Biography ==
He hails from Chicago, Illinois. His family moved to Southern California in 1980. He attended Cerritos College before transferring to the University of Southern California.

Lester Barrie has enjoyed much success as a stand-up comedian over the years. In 1993 he won best comedian on Star Search over a young Dave Chappelle. Chappelle has publicly joked on a few occasions about being more successful than Barrie. Proud to be a footnote in Chappelle's career, Barrie would counter with pointing to Chris Tucker (Rush Hour, Friday) D. L. Hughley (The Original Kings of Comedy), and other A-list comedians who also suffered losses to Lester Barrie in comedy competitions in the early to mid 1990s. Lester is legendary in that he was honored as a "Def Comedy Jam" All Star, and an "Apollo" Legend. In 1999, Barrie joined the short list of comedians to host a full season of Comic View on Black Entertainment Television.

Lester Barrie has also enjoyed moderate success in small acting roles, most notably guest-starring on several episodes of Fox's & Sci-Fi Networks Sliders and best known for a guest role in the Wayans brothers film Don't Be a Menace to South Central While Drinking Your Juice in the Hood as the Preacher.

Lester Barrie has recorded a Dry Bar Comedy Special entitle "A Fan of Marriage" and the stand-up comedy special "Super Saint" which is available on Amazon. Television appearance as a stand-up comedian would include a set on Martin Lawrence's First Amendment Stand Up on the STARZ Network in 2009. To date Lester Barrie makes frequent appearances at the Comedy and Magic Club in Hermosa Beach Ca, and the Laugh Factory in Hollywood and Long Beach, California.
