= David Peckinpah =

American screenwriter

David Ernest Peckinpah (September 5, 1951 – April 23, 2006) was a Canadian television writer, producer and director. David was the nephew of film director Sam Peckinpah and son of Denver "Denny" Peckinpah, a Fresno County Superior Court Judge. He was the writer and producer of several series including the cable TV shows DEA, Silk Stalkings, Sliders and Beauty and the Beast. He also had a number of series in development at the time of his death.

== Sliders ==
Fox brought Peckinpah onto the television series Sliders in its third season. Peckinpah has been derided by fans, who argue that his involvement (and by extension Fox's more hands-on involvement) caused the show to "jump the shark".

Peckinpah and his execution of the studio's wishes along with his own changes eventually caused the departure of cast members John Rhys-Davies (an outspoken critic of studio interference impacting writing quality since the first season) and Sabrina Lloyd who were unhappy with the repeated changes to the shows original vision. Peckinpah retaliated to both the criticism and their leaving the show by having their respective characters go through humiliating situations before their eventual deaths, including having Lloyd's character, Wade Welles, sent to an alien breeding internment camp. Rhys-Davies later vowed that he would not return to Sliders as long as Peckinpah had a hand in the show.

Sliders co-creator Tracy Tormé was highly critical of Sliders in its third season. When the show was cancelled and the show was picked up by the Sci-Fi Channel, Tormé attempted to retake control of the series. One of Tormé's conditions was the removal of David Peckinpah from the series. Peckinpah had already signed a two-year contract with Universal, and Universal elected to keep Peckinpah. Tormé left the series.

== Personal life ==
David was married to actress and producer Sandy Peckinpah from 1974 until his death in 2006. They had four children: Garrett (b. 1978; d. 1994), Trevor (born 1982), Julianne Belle (born 1988), and Jackson (born 1992). Julianne was born with a bilateral cleft lip, which inspired David's wife to write books about children born with special needs. Some books are Rosey the Imperfect Angel, Chester the Imperfect All-Star (inspired by baseball pitcher Jim Abbott), and Fairy Tale Life . . . Interrupted. David and Sandy were writing partners and co-founders of DASAN Productions.

In 1994, when Garrett was 16 he died suddenly from meningitis. Close friends Melissa Gilbert and Bruce Boxleitner subsequently named their own son, born prematurely that year in October, Michael Garrett Boxleitner (in honor of Michael Landon and Garrett Peckinpah).

Following the death of his first son, David relapsed into drug and alcohol abuse, after nearly 20 years of sobriety. In 2004, David began renting a home in Vancouver that he would use as a creative space for writing and production, commuting to and from his family home in California. However, this arrangement proved to be tragic. On April 23, 2006, David died of heart failure caused by drug overdose in Vancouver, B.C. He was 54. Today his widow, Sandy, is a realtor and writer in Murrieta, California.
