= Like a Surgeon =

1985 single by "Weird Al" Yankovic

Single by "Weird Al" Yankovic

from the album Dare to Be Stupid
- B-side: "Slime Creatures from Outer Space"
- Released: June 4, 1985
- Recorded: February 21, 1985
- Studio: Santa Monica Sound (Santa Monica, California)
- Genre: Comedy; parody; pop
- Length: 3:27
- Label: Scotti Brothers
- Songwriters: "Weird Al" Yankovic; Tom Kelly; Billy Steinberg
- Producer: Rick Derringer

"Weird Al" Yankovic singles chronology
"This Is the Life" (1984)	"Like a Surgeon" (1985)	"I Want a New Duck" (1985)

Music video
- "Like a Surgeon" on YouTube

"Like a Surgeon" is a song recorded by "Weird Al" Yankovic that appears as the opening track on his third studio album, Dare to Be Stupid (1985). It was released as the album's second single on June 4, 1985, by Scotti Brothers Records. It was issued as a 7", 12", and picture disc. A parody of the pop song "Like a Virgin" by Madonna, its lyrics describe a hospital environment, with the same melody as Madonna's original. The track was written by Yankovic, Tom Kelly and Billy Steinberg, the latter two are credited as co-writers due to the "Like a Virgin" sample. Madonna came up with the parody's title, an act Yankovic generally discourages. Rick Derringer served as the executive producer.

"Like a Surgeon" was well received by music critics, who praised Yankovic's take on Madonna's single. Another critic called it "as good" as "Like a Virgin". In the United States, it peaked at number 47 on the Billboard Hot 100, becoming his fifth entry in that country at the time. It also peaked in the top forty of Australia and Canada, with the former peaking at number 19. For live performances of the recording, Yankovic further borrowed elements from Madonna's renditions, singing live in a hospital surrounding, sporting similar outfits and costumes.

== Writing and development ==
Although Yankovic generally did not use parody ideas from other musicians, Madonna was partly involved during the writing process of the track. Reportedly, Madonna was walking with a friend in New York City when she wondered out loud when Yankovic would parody her 1984 hit "Like a Virgin" with "Like a Surgeon". The friend was a mutual acquaintance of Jay Levey, Yankovic's manager, and brought the idea up to him following the encounter. This is the only known time that Yankovic has obtained an idea directly from the original artist, as he "openly discourages people from giving him parody ideas". It was recorded alongside other singles in February 1985: "I Want a New Duck" and "Hooked on Polkas", and album track "Girls Just Want to Have Lunch".

Yankovic parodies the pop song by speaking from the point of view of a new surgeon who is "more bothered by the fact that his patients are dying before they can pay than the fact that they're dying at all". Before the chorus, he also coos: "I'll pull his insides out, pull his insides out / And see what he ate".

== Reception ==
Critical reception for "Like a Surgeon" was generally positive. In Eugene Chadbourne's AllMusic album review for Dare to Be Stupid, he congratulated Yankovic for "perhaps his best parody ever, the brilliant and cutting 'Like a Surgeon'". Chadbourne continued: "Turning the tacky Madonna hit inside out and upside down, Yankovic comes up with a hilarious satire of the medical profession." Richard Stim, claimed in his book Music Law: How to Run Your Band's Business that "Like a Surgeon" was "an effective parody", while Bryan Brewer from the Digital Audio and Compact Disc Review called it "as good on CD as the original, digitally recorded 'Like a Virgin'". Christopher Thelen of Daily Vault didn't find it up to par with the singer's previous parodies; however, Thelen stated: "but since I've developed a healthy distrust of the medical community, I appreciate the somewhat biting sarcasm that Yankovic works in."

Commercially, the single became one of Yankovic's more well-known works. In the United States, it became his fifth entry on the Billboard Hot 100, and highest since "Eat It"'s peak of number 12 in 1984. It climbed the charts for eight weeks in mid 1985, before reaching its peak at number 47 for the week ending July 13, 1985. On list compiling Yankovic's most successful releases, Billboard described "Like a Surgeon" as his third biggest hit single. According to RPM, the single reached its peak of 37 on August 17 of the same year, becoming his second entry in Canada. In Australia, it peaked at number 19, similarly his third highest peak in that country at the time.

== Promotion ==
The music video was directed by Jay Levey and Robert K. Weiss and is set in a hospital. It parodies several elements of the promotional video for "Like a Virgin", famously set in Venice; Yankovic singing on a moving gurney references Madonna on a canal boat, and both videos feature a lion at the beginning. During one scene, a Madonna wannabe is sitting in a corner filing her nails. At the end of the "Like a Surgeon" music video, dance moves and scene changes spoof the video for Madonna's "Burning Up", then Yankovic and two dancers perform a routine that spoofs the video for "Lucky Star". Both songs appear on Madonna's first album. The video also includes the famous PA announcement from The Three Stooges ("Paging Dr. Howard, Dr. Fine, Dr. Howard"). The visual would later be included on Yankovic's 1992 video album The "Weird Al" Yankovic Video Library.

Filming was done at a closed hospital that had been turned into a set for various productions where hospital shots were needed. The lion was real, and Yankovic recalled several of the actors were slightly intimidated by the lion being led through the sets.

Yankovic has performed "Like a Surgeon" at several of his concert tours. A staff member from Rolling Stone called the renditions a "key part of Yankovic's live show[s] for decades". For the performance, he mocks Madonna's "Middle Eastern rendition" from her Blond Ambition World Tour of 1990, as shown in her 1991 documentary film Madonna: Truth or Dare.

== Track listing and formats ==
- US 7" single
1. "Like a Surgeon" – 3:27
2. "King of Suede" – 4:12
- US 7" picture disc single
1. "Like a Surgeon" – 3:27
2. "Like a Surgeon" – 3:27
- Mexico 12" vinyl single
1. "Like a Surgeon" – 3:27
2. "Girls Just Wanna Have Lunch" – 4:21
- German 12" single
1. "Like a Surgeon" – 3:27
2. "Slime Creatures from Outer Space" – 4:23

== Credits and personnel ==
Credits adapted from the liner notes of Dare to Be Stupid, Scotti Brothers.

Recording

- Recorded at Santa Monica Sound Records, Santa Monica, California

Personnel

- "Weird Al" Yankovic – lead vocals, songwriting
- Madonna – songwriting
- Rick Derringer – production
- Tom Kelly – composition
- Tony Papa – engineer
- Billy Steinberg – composition

== Charts ==
Chart (1985)	Peak Position
Australia (Kent Music Report)	19
Canada Top Singles (RPM)	35
Cash Box (Cashbox)	41
US Billboard Hot 100	47

== Release history ==
On June 4, 1985, "Like a Surgeon" was released as a 7" single by Scotti Brothers Records, while a 12" and picture disc would also be released in Mexico and Germany, respectively.

Region	Date	Format	Label
United States	June 4, 1985	7"	Scotti Brothers
Germany	1985	Picture disc	Scotti Brothers
Mexico	1985	12"	Epic

== Legacy ==
The creation of the song was parodied in the show How I Met Your Mother. In one episode, lead character Ted Mosby gave "Weird Al" the idea to the song after sending him a fan letter when he was 8 years old.

The creation of "Like a Surgeon", partially from Madonna's suggestion, became part of several scenes in the 2010 satirical Funny or Die web short, "Weird: The Al Yankovic Story" in which Yankovic (played by Aaron Paul) ends up in a love affair with Madonna (played by Olivia Wilde). The short, including this love affair, was later expanded into a full film, Weird: The Al Yankovic Story for 2022, with Yankovic now played by Daniel Radcliffe, and Evan Rachel Wood as Madonna.

== See also ==
- List of singles by "Weird Al" Yankovic
- List of songs by "Weird Al" Yankovic
