= Tracy Tormé =

American screenwriter (1959–2024)

- Born: April 12, 1959; Los Angeles, California, U.S.
- Died: January 4, 2024 (aged 64); Escondido, California, U.S.
- Occupations: Screenwriter; television producer
- Parents: Mel Tormé (father); Arlene Miles (mother)

Tracy Tormé (April 12, 1959 – January 4, 2024) was an American screenwriter and television producer, known for his work on the science fiction series Sliders and Star Trek: The Next Generation, and the film Fire in the Sky.

== Early life ==
Tracy Tormé was born on April 12, 1959, in Los Angeles, to Arlene Miles and singer Mel Tormé. He was educated at the University of Southern California and Loyola Marymount University, where he studied film.

== Career ==
Tormé began his career in the 1970s, as a writer on SCTV. From 1982 to 1983, he was a writer for Saturday Night Live. Later in the decade, he was a story editor and writer on the first two seasons of Star Trek: The Next Generation, but left over creative differences.

In 1991 with Barry Oringer, Tormé wrote the screenplay for the miniseries Intruders which ran on CBS in May 1992. Intruders was based on the book of the same name by Budd Hopkins.

With Robert K. Weiss he co-created the television series Sliders, which ran 1995–2000. Other series he wrote for included Odyssey 5 and Carnivàle.

Tormé wrote the screenplay for the 1993 film Fire in the Sky based on Travis Walton's book The Walton Experience. He was credited as a co-producer on the 2007 film I Am Legend, and wrote an early treatment for the project.

== Accolades ==
Tormé was nominated for the 1993 Saturn Award for Best Writing for his screenplay on the film Fire in the Sky.

== Personal life and death ==
Tormé had siblings Steve, Melissa, Daisy, and James Tormé, and step-siblings Carrie Tormé and Kurt Goldsmith. He was married twice.

Tormé died of complications from diabetes in Escondido, California, on January 4, 2024, at the age of 64.

== Bibliography ==
- Linaweaver, Brad; Sliders: The Classic Episodes. 1998. TV Books. New York. ISBN 1-57500-053-9. Pages 274–75.
