= Robert Floyd (actor) =

American actor (born 1967)

- Born: May 6, 1968 (age 56)
- Occupation: Actor
- Years active: 1995–2010

Robert Floyd (born May 6, 1968) is an American television and film actor.

== Career ==
He has appeared in several independent films as well as the feature film Godzilla. He has also guest starred on a variety of television series including Dark Angel, Walker, Texas Ranger and NCIS.

He is best known for his role as an accidentally merged version of the lead character, Mallory (played by Jerry O'Connell in the first four seasons) in the final season of the science fiction television show Sliders. He appeared in 18 episodes, aired from 1999 until 2000 on the Sci-Fi Channel.
