= Robert K. Weiss =

American film and television producer

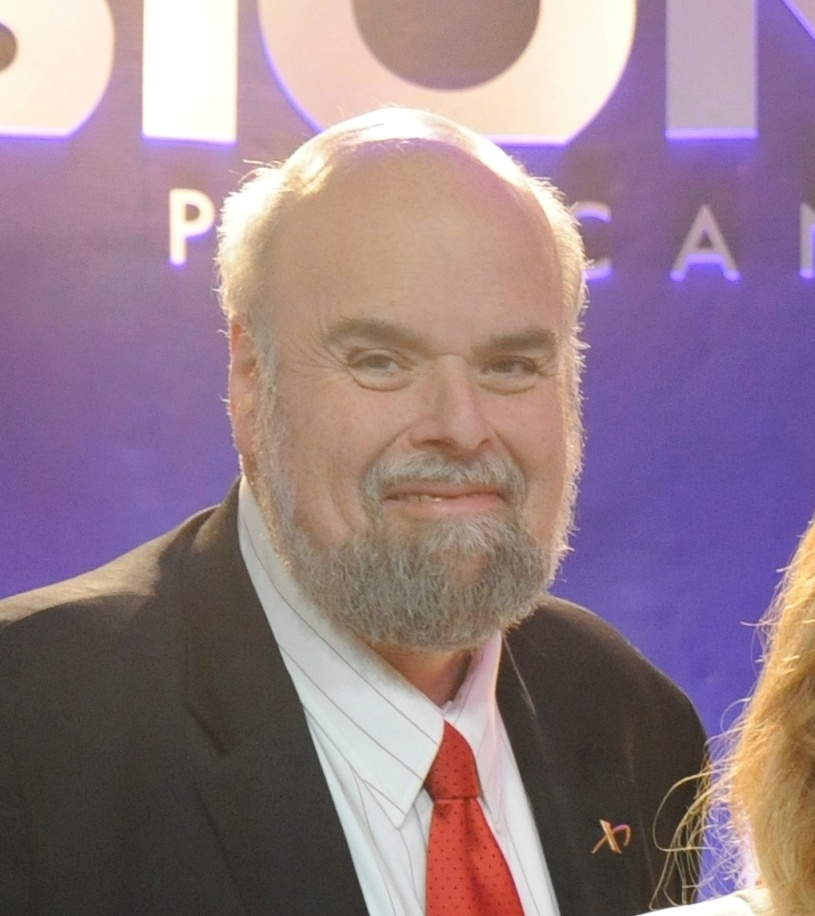
- Weiss in 2013
- Occupation: Producer
- Years active: 1977–2014

Robert K. Weiss is an American film and television producer. His productions include films by director John Landis, producer Lorne Michaels and the "Z. A. Z." team of Jim Abrahams, David Zucker and Jerry Zucker. He also co-created the science-fiction TV series Sliders. He is a graduate of Southern Illinois University Carbondale.

Weiss has been the President and Vice Chairman of the X Prize Foundation since 1996.

== Filmography ==
Producer

- Kentucky Fried Movie (1977)
- The Blues Brothers (1980)
- Police Squad! (TV series, 1982)
- Doctor Detroit (1983)
- The Compleat Al (made for video, 1985) Also writer and director ("Dare to Be Stupid," "Like a Surgeon," "One More Minute", "This Is the Life")
- Dragnet (1987)
- Amazon Women on the Moon (1987) Also director (segments "Murray in Videoland", "Amazon Women on the Moon", "Silly Paté", "Video Pirates", "First Lady of the Evening", "Titan Man")
- The Naked Gun: From the Files of Police Squad! (1988)
- Crazy People (1990)
- Nothing but Trouble (1991)
- The Naked Gun 2½: The Smell of Fear (1991)
- Naked Gun 33 1/3: The Final Insult (1994)
- Scary Movie 3 (2003)
- Scary Movie 4 (2006)
- Superhero Movie (2008)

Executive producer

- Weird Science (TV series, 1994–1997)
- Sliders (TV series, 1995–2000) Also co-creator and executive consultant (seasons 2–3)
- Tommy Boy (1995)
- Black Sheep (1996)
- A Night at the Roxbury (1998)
- Superstar (1999)
- The Ladies Man (2000)

2nd unit director

- The Naked Gun: From the Files of Police Squad! (1988)
- Crazy People (1990)
- The Naked Gun 2½: The Smell of Fear (1991)
- Naked Gun 33 1/3: The Final Insult (1994)
- Sliders (TV series, 1995) (pilot)
- Tommy Boy (1995)

Actor

- Kentucky Fried Movie (1977)
- The Naked Gun: From the Files of Police Squad! (1988)
- UHF (1989)
- Nothing but Trouble (1991)
- Crazy People (1990)
- The Naked Gun 2½: The Smell of Fear (1991)
- Naked Gun 33 1/3: The Final Insult (1994)
- Tommy Boy (1995)
