= The "Weird Al" Yankovic Video Library =

Video by "Weird Al" Yankovic
- Released: May 22, 1992
- Length: 40 minutes (VHS)
- Label: Scotti Brothers
- Directors: Francis Delia; Janet Greek; Dror Soref; Robert K. Weiss; Jay Levey; "Weird Al" Yankovic
- Producer: "Weird Al" Yankovic

"Weird Al" Yankovic video chronology
UHF (1989)	The "Weird Al" Yankovic Video Library (1992)	Alapalooza: The Videos (1993)

The "Weird Al" Yankovic Video Library is a VHS release of most of "Weird Al" Yankovic's music videos to date. It was released on May 22, 1992 by Scotti Brothers Records. The video has been certified gold by the RIAA with excess sales of 50,000 copies.

The VHS contains 12 music videos:

- "Fat" (from Even Worse album)
- "Smells Like Nirvana" (from Off the Deep End album)
- "Like a Surgeon" (from Dare to Be Stupid album)
- "Eat It" (from "Weird Al" Yankovic in 3-D album)
- "Living with a Hernia" (from Polka Party! album)
- "Dare to Be Stupid" (from Dare to Be Stupid album)
- "This Is The Life ("Weird Al" Yankovic)" (from Dare to Be Stupid album)
- "I Lost on Jeopardy" (from "Weird Al" Yankovic in 3-D album)
- "I Love Rocky Road" (from "Weird Al" Yankovic)
- "Christmas at Ground Zero" (from Polka Party! album)
- "Ricky"(from "Weird Al" Yankovic)
- "One More Minute" (from Dare to Be Stupid album)

Notable, for their absence, are "UHF" and "Money For Nothing/Beverly Hillbillies", Yankovic's only two music videos at the time of release not to be included. Both songs are from the album UHF - Original Motion Picture Soundtrack And Other Stuff. They were both later released on VHS, with "UHF" appearing on Alapalooza: The Videos and "Money for Nothing/Beverly Hillbillies" appearing on Bad Hair Day: The Videos.
