= The Weird Al Show =

Television series

- DVD cover
- Genre: Children's television series Surreal humor
- Created by: "Weird Al" Yankovic
- Directed by: Peyton Reed
- Presented by: "Weird Al" Yankovic
- Starring: Brian Haley; Gary LeRoi Gray; Judy Tenuta; Paula Jai Parker; Danielle Weeks
- Narrated by: Billy West
- Country of origin: United States
- No. of seasons: 1
- No. of episodes: 13

Production
- Executive producers: Dick Clark "Weird Al" Yankovic; Jay Levey
- Production locations: NBC Studios Stage 11, Burbank, CA
- Running time: 23 minutes
- Production companies: Ear Booker Productions; Dick Clark Productions

Original release
- Network: CBS
- Release: September 13 – December 6, 1997

The Weird Al Show is an American television series created by and starring musician and comedian "Weird Al" Yankovic. Produced in association with Dick Clark Productions and taped at NBC Studios, it aired on Saturday mornings on CBS. The show ran for one season, from September 13 to December 6, 1997, with reruns airing until September 26, 1998. The show was released on DVD on August 15, 2006.

The show is framed as a show-within-a-show, with Yankovic, starring as himself, living in an underground home while working as a television show host. It uses a combination of live-action skits with numerous guests, animated shorts, and musical performances by Yankovic and other guest bands. CBS had greenlit the show from Yankovic, seeking content for its required Educational/Informative programming block and framed similarly to Pee-Wee's Playhouse. Because of this, Yankovic and his writers struggled with developing content appropriate for children's programming that met CBS's expectations while still within Yankovic's form of visual and adult humor.

== Synopsis ==
Each episode starts with a narrator (Billy West) introducing today's lesson to the viewers. Then, Al is in a common situation in his cave dwelling that he addresses to the viewers. Afterward, he watches a TV displaying parody shows and commercials that are related to the day's show. Most of the time, Al's friend Bobby the Inquisitive Boy stops by and asks him a question. In turn, Al plays him an old-fashioned educational film (with the original dialogue replaced) to help answer his question. Sometimes, the show features an animated cartoon called "Fatman", which is about Weird Al as a fat superhero. At the end of the show, there is a commercial parody followed by a band performing a song. Sometimes, Al reviews today's lesson before closing out the show.

== Development ==
Around the time of recording "Eat It" in 1984, Yankovic and his manager started pitching the idea of a children's show hosted by Yankovic, believing that his energy suited this format well. It was not until the 1990s that the American network CBS showed interest, specifically looking for Saturday morning content that would meet new Federal Communications Commission (FCC) rules requiring broadcast networks to carry a number of hours of "Educational/Informative" (E/I) programming content. While this was not Yankovic's preferred approach, he considered it "the deal we made with the devil" to get his show on air.

Director Peyton Reed was brought to the show through his wife, who worked in a music video production company that had done some of Yankovic's music videos, and was hired by CBS to produce the show. The show had been pitched to Reed as similar to Pee-wee's Playhouse, but to have a more subversive humor that followed Yankovic's style of comedy. CBS brought in Wayne White, the production designer for Pee-wee's Playhouse, to construct the set for "The Weird Al Show". For casting, Yankovic used a combination of previous actors he collaborated with (such as Judy Tenuta) and casting calls for others.

Filming was done in NBC Studios in Burbank, California, in the same sound stage used by The Tonight Show Starring Johnny Carson and down the hall from the recording of The Tonight Show with Jay Leno. As Yankovic had difficulty in getting guests, he had sometimes tried to ask Leno's guests to appear on his show while they were waiting backstage; he had approached and secured Drew Carey's appearance this way.

Writing for the show was challenged due to the E/I expectations demanded by CBS. CBS, through producer Dick Clark, frequently demanded changes to some of the visual humor written by Yankovic and the writing staff, fearing it was "imitable behavior" for children watching, and which limited how much visual comedy they could use. CBS also demanded a moral for each episode, and insisted that the moral had to be stated clearly at the start of each episode. To get around this, Yankovic brought in voice actor Billy West to scream out the moral at the very start of the episode, and then let the episode continue as they wanted. The writers knew some of their material would be scrapped by censors but wrote such scenes anyway, but were often surprised at what the censors left in. For example, a sketch in which Baby and Papa Boolie commit suicide after listening to one too many of Fred Huggins's songs was being seriously considered by the network for use on the show. The sketch was later rewritten to have Papa Boolie call a mental hospital to take Fred away. The unused script of the unedited Fred Huggins sequence is role-played in an audio commentary for an episode on the DVD.

CBS also wanted more of Yankovic's music parodies as part of the show, though they would not pay for the royalties for the original song. Yankovic ended up doing one original parody, "Lousy Haircut", based on "Firestarter" by The Prodigy. The network desired to see musical acts of younger musical groups that would appeal to their target audience at the time. One of these was Hanson, who had just reached fame with their single "MMMBop". From this, Yankovic and the band members developed a camaraderie that continued long after the show, with Yankovic helping to direct some of their later videos. The show also featured the first television broadcast of the Barenaked Ladies, though Yankovic was surprised that the network allowed them to use the band's full name at the time.

The show was cancelled after one season. Yankovic and the others on the team acknowledged that CBS did not find that the show followed the formulatic pattern set by Pee-wee's Playhouse, and coupled with difficulties in keeping the show in check, opted to cancel it. Yankovic and others on the production found in retrospect that working on the show was far too stressful and not the vision of what they wanted it to be; for the show's DVD commentary, much of the commentary ended up being directed at the issues they had with CBS in producing the show.

=== Undeveloped material ===
The series contains many Star Wars references, and Yankovic planned a segment in which he claimed to have played Luke Skywalker's "annoying younger brother" in scenes cut from the original Star Wars film. According to Yankovic, he planned to show "actual scenes from Star Wars with me green-screened into them, seamlessly interacting with the characters. Of course, we had to get clearances from everybody before CBS would agree to let us shoot it. In the end, George Lucas signed off on it, and Sir Alec Guinness signed off on it, but Mark Hamill would not agree to let us use any footage with him in it -- so unfortunately, the whole bit had to be scrapped."

== Music ==
=== Theme song ===
The theme song can be found on Yankovic's album Running with Scissors (1999) as "The Weird Al Show Theme".

It tells the story of how Al came to live in a cave and get a television show, including references to the fabricated life story in The Compleat Al, such as having worked in a nasal decongestant factory. Also referenced is playing on the company bowling team, which may be a reference to "Generic Blues".

The visuals for the show's theme are done in three different styles: traditional animation, 3D computer animation, and claymation. The claymation portion was done by Mark Osborne and Scott Nordlund, who had previously done Yankovic's "Jurassic Park" music video, and the CGI portion was done by DNA Productions, with Jireh Animation doing the traditional animation portion, with inking done by Epoch Ink.

=== Bite Me ===
After the end credits of each case, when the "Ear Booker Productions" logo flashes on the screen repeatedly, a three-second version of the "Bite Me" track can be heard. "Bite Me" originally appeared as a six second long hidden track on the CD version of Weird Al" Yankovic's 1992 album Off the Deep End. The track appeared after 10 minutes of the final track ("You Don't Love Me Anymore"). The track was included as a parody of Nirvana's hidden track on the album Nevermind, but also to scare listeners into turning off the CD.

== Cast ==
- "Weird Al" Yankovic as himself, Fred Huggins, Tony Malone, Fatman, various other characters
- Eddie Deezen as The Guy Boarded in the Wall
- Donavan Freberg as Baby Boolie
- Stan Freberg as Papa Boolie, J. B. Toppersmith
- Gary LeRoi Gray as Bobby the Inquisitive Boy
- Brian Haley as The Hooded Avenger
- Harvey the Wonder Hamster as himself
- Ed Marques as Varna the Squirmese Cook
- Paula Jai Parker as Val Brentwood, Gal Spy
- Patricia Place as Mrs. Fesenmeyer
- Jack Plotnick as Uncle Ralphie
- Judy Tenuta as Madame Judy the Psychic
- Danielle Weeks as Al's (fictional) cousin Corky
- Billy West as the show's narrator/announcer, voice of Harvey the Wonder Hamster in "Fatman" shorts
- Mary & Nick Yankovic (Al's real-life parents) as themselves

Gedde Watanabe's character, Kuni, also appeared in Yankovic's film, UHF. David Bowe, Victoria Jackson, Kevin McCarthy, and Emo Philips who also were in the film made cameos on the show.

== Episodes ==
No.	Title	Original release date	Prod. code
1	"Bad Influence"	September 13, 1997	3603
Al meets a new friend named Spike who has a "way-moby (cool) club," and Spike tells Al that he has to rip off one pant-leg, stick his arms in chocolate syrup, and shave-off his right eyebrow to be able to join the club. He eventually finds out it was all made up, and kicks him out of the house. Guest appearances: Downtown Julie Brown as Fashion Reporter, Patton Oswalt as Seymour, Kevin Weisman as Spike & Barenaked Ladies as musical guest
2	"Promises, Promises"	September 20, 1997	3604
Al lies to his friends about being buddies with John Tesh, so in order to raise the $82,000 appearance fee Tesh charges he does infomercials to sell worthless junk. Eventually all his customers want a refund, including Tesh himself. Guest appearances: Mike Levey as himself, Tony Little as himself, Ron Popeil as himself & John Tesh as himself
3	"Mining Accident"	September 27, 1997	3602
Some coal miners break through Al's house and he has to learn to make friends with them. Guest appearances: David Bowe as Miner, Clarence Clemons as Miner, David Lander as Miner, Michael McKean as Miner, Emo Philips (voice) as Slaw Meister & Martha Quinn as Woman in Commercial
4	"Back to School"	October 4, 1997	3605
Al decides he wants to become smarter, and soon regrets it. Guest appearances: Bill Mumy as Delivery Guy, Alex Trebek as himself & Gedde Watanabe as Kuni (Watanabe previously played this role on UHF)
5	"Time Machine"	October 11, 1997	3609
Al forgot to get Harvey the Wonder Hamster a present on his birthday, so he uses his new invention to go back in time and get Harvey a present. Guest appearances: Teri Garr as herself, Victoria Jackson as Crying Woman, Steve Jay as musical guest, Jon "Bermuda" Schwartz as musical guest, Rubén Valtierra as musical guest & Jim West as musical guest
6	"One for the Record Books"	October 18, 1997	3606
Harvey the Wonder Hamster gets radioactive and grows to four times the size of Al, becoming the world's biggest hamster on Earth and getting put in the Guinness Book of World Records. Al becomes jealous and tries to make himself a world record. Guest appearances: Todd Patrick Braugh as Gene Siskel, Mark Kineavy as Roger Ebert, Ric Sarabia as Bearded Man, Scott Streltzoff as Free Thrower, Ian Whitcomb as Sir Alec & Hanson as musical guest
7	"Because I Said So"	October 25, 1997	3607
Al has to babysit Huey, Al's television producer's greedy nephew. Guest appearances: Charles Fleischer as Buford, Mathew McCurley as Huey, Tahj Mowry as himself & Dick Van Patten as himself
8	"Talent Show"	November 1, 1997	3612
Today is the day of the annual "Weird Al talent show", but Cousin Corky gets stage fright. Guest appearances: Henry Corden as Fred Flintstone, Cathy Ladman as Cindy, Jean Vander Pyl as Wilma Flintstone, Mary Lynn Rajskub as Weather Woman, John Roarke as Clint Eastwood, Roger Rose as Talk Show Host, Jon "Bermuda" Schwartz as Drummer, Matt Weinhold as Game Show Host & Immature as musical guest
9	"Al Plays Hooky"	November 8, 1997	3611
Al decides to take a vacation, leaving Cousin Corky stuck hosting the show. Guest appearances: Fabio as himself, Daisy Fuentes as herself & Kevin McCarthy as Mayor
10	"He Ain't Heavy, He's My Hamster"	November 15, 1997	3601
Al bullies Harvey about doing a death-defying stunt, and must make amends. According to the DVD commentary, this was originally intended to be the debut, hence containing exposition for characters and segments that seem out of place on what turned out to be the tenth aired episode. Guest appearances: Dr. Demento as himself, John Ennis as Dad, Loretta Fox as Mom, Dale Hallcom as Three Armed Guy, Rick Overton as Mr. Molasses, Emo Philips as Dr. Philips & Dweezil Zappa as himself
11	"The Competition"	November 22, 1997	3608
Al competes against Fred Huggins and Uncle Ralphie to see who is the best TV show host. Guest appearances: Jimmy Briscoe as Mippy, Drew Carey as himself, Fred Willard as Award Show Host, Radish as musical guest & Jack Plotnick as Uncle Ralphie
12	"The Obligatory Holiday Episode"	November 29, 1997	3613
Al celebrates the holidays with his friends. This was the last episode recorded and was intended to run last, however it ended up being the second-to-last episode aired. Guest appearances: Dick Clark as himself, The Amazing Johnathan as Uncle Johnathan & Martin Lewis as Token Brit
13	"Al Gets Robbed"	December 6, 1997	3610
Al returns to the cave from a trip and finds that all of his stuff has been stolen. Guest appearances: Gilbert Gottfried as Al's imaginary friend Gilbert, Martha Quinn as Woman in Commercial, "Macho Man" Randy Savage as himself, Dick Van Patten as Burglar & All-4-One as musical guest Note: In this episode, the Hooded Avenger walks over to Al delivering him his tabloid papers. The paper is called "Midnight Star", referring to the same-titled song about the tabloid off "Weird Al" Yankovic in 3-D. The main headline, "Incredible Frog Boy on the Loose", refers to a lyric in the song.

== Home media ==
The Weird Al Show: The Complete Series was released on August 15, 2006 by Shout Factory. It is a 3-DVD set of all 13 episodes of The Weird Al Show, plus bonus features. The episodes are presented in broadcast order.

The Weird Al Show was released on DVD in Canada on September 26, 2006, alongside the U.S. release of his new album, Straight Outta Lynwood.

Before the DVD set release, a compilation of the short music video segments for "Lousy Haircut", "Lasagna", and "Livin' in the Fridge" (as well as the show opening) was released on "Weird Al" Yankovic: The Ultimate Video Collection in 2003.

=== Special features ===
- 13 commentaries with "Weird Al" as well as other cast and crew members.
- "The Evolution of 'Fatman'", a featurette consisting of original concept art—the "Fatman" cartoons were based on Weird Al's hit song, "Fat".
- Concept art gallery.
- Animated storyboards.
- Karaoke for the show's Theme Song.
