= Alapalooza: The Videos =

1993 film

Video by "Weird Al" Yankovic
- Released: December 1993
- Length: 15 minutes (VHS)
- Labels: Scotti Brothers; BMG
- Directors: Jay Levey; Scott Norlund; Mark Osborne; "Weird Al" Yankovic
- Producer: "Weird Al" Yankovic

"Weird Al" Yankovic video chronology
| The "Weird Al" Yankovic Video Library (1992) | Alapalooza: The Videos (1993) | Bad Hair Day: The Videos (1996) |

Alapalooza: The Videos is a VHS release of four of "Weird Al" Yankovic's music videos. Al later joked that it was originally supposed to be called “Alapalooza: Two Videos Based On Songs From The Album And Two Videos That Really Don’t Have Anything To Do With Alapalooza But We Thought You’d Appreciate Having Them On This Collection Anyway” but the retailers preferred the shorter title.

== Track listing ==
1. "Jurassic Park" (Alapalooza)
2. "Bedrock Anthem" (Alapalooza)
3. "UHF" (UHF)
4. "You Don't Love Me Anymore" (Off the Deep End)

== Chart positions ==
| Chart (1999) | Peak position |
|---|---|
| US Top Music Videos | 4 |

== Certifications ==
| Region | Certification | Certified units/sales |
|---|---|---|
| United States (RIAA) | Gold | 50,000^{^} |
^{^} Shipments figures based on certification alone.
