= "Weird Al" Yankovic: The Ultimate Video Collection =

2003 video album

Video by "Weird Al" Yankovic
- Released: November 4, 2003
- Genre: Parody
- Label: Volcano

"Weird Al" Yankovic: The Ultimate Video Collection is a compilation of videos by the American parody artist and satirist "Weird Al" Yankovic. The DVD included music videos from tracks for every album released up until the point of the DVD's release.

== Release ==
The DVD was released with a few bonus features such as a photo gallery and 5.1 surround sound. It also includes an Easter egg of an unofficial music video for "My Bologna."

== Critical reception ==
Professional ratings
Review scores
Source	Rating
AllMusic	4.5/5 stars
KCUniversal	A+

PopMatters' Patrick Schabe stated that "in some ways, from a fan's perspective it's disappointing that Al's originals were never as popular as his parodies of other artists, but it's hardly surprising."

== Track listing ==
1. "Fat" – 4:56
2. "Amish Paradise" – 3:26
3. "It's All About the Pentiums" – 3:35
4. "Smells Like Nirvana" – 3:46
5. "You Don't Love Me Anymore" – 4:30
6. "Bedrock Anthem" – 3:53
7. "Gump" – 2:18
8. "Jurassic Park" – 3:58
9. "Headline News" – 3:30
10. "Dare to Be Stupid" – 3:29
11. "Eat It" – 3:30
12. "Like a Surgeon" – 4:07
13. "UHF" – 4:04
14. "Money for Nothing/Beverly Hillbillies*" – 3:08
15. "One More Minute" – 4:08
16. "I Lost on Jeopardy" – 3:47
17. "This Is the Life" – 3:08
18. "Living With a Hernia" – 3:23
19. "Spy Hard" – 2:49
20. "Ricky" – 2:40
21. "Christmas at Ground Zero" – 3:03
22. "I Love Rocky Road" – 2:38
23. "Bob" – 2:31
24. "The Saga Begins" – 5:41

== Charts ==
Chart	Peak position
Billboard Top Music Videos	22

== Certifications and sales ==
Region	Certification	Certified units/sales
United States (RIAA)	Platinum	100,000^{^}
^{^} Shipments figures based on certification alone.
