= Jim Self =

American tubist and composer (1943–2025)

- Born: James Martin Self; August 20, 1943; Franklin, Pennsylvania, U.S.
- Died: November 2, 2025 (aged 82) Los Angeles, California, U.S.
- Education: Indiana State College (BS); Catholic University of America (MM); University of Southern California (DMA)
- Genres: Jazz; pop; rock and roll; classical; film score
- Occupation: Musician; composer
- Instrument: Tuba
- Years active: 1965–2025

James Martin Self (August 20, 1943 – November 2, 2025) was an American tubist and composer from Los Angeles. Self performed extensively in Los Angeles and internationally as a soloist, chamber musician, orchestral tubist, and most notably as a studio musician in movie studios in Los Angeles. He appeared on over 1500 soundtracks. He was also known for his association with the Pasadena Symphony, the Pacific Symphony, the Los Angeles Opera, and the Hollywood Bowl Orchestra.

== Background ==
James Martin Self was born in Franklin, Pennsylvania on August 20, 1943, the third youngest of four siblings born to Helen Louise (née Martin, 1907–1980) and James Warren "Pete" Self (1906–1959). He grew up in Oil City, Pennsylvania nearby to the east. His father, James, worked as an assistant production manager at the Worthington Corporation and played softball and baseball. His mother, Helen, was a member of the First Baptist Church there. His older brother, William, worked as an electrical engineer.

After graduating from Oil City High School in 1961, Jim Self went to Indiana State College (now known as Indiana University of Pennsylvania) in Indiana, Pennsylvania. He studied under trumpeter William Becker, whom he considered a "a father figure and a kind of soul mate". In 1965, he earned his bachelor's degree in music education. After graduation, Self joined the United States Army Band. The concert band tuba section included Leo Hurst, Bob Pallansch, Dan Perantoni, Chester Schmitz, and Paul Scott. During his time with the U.S. Army Band, Self earned a Master of Music in Tuba Performance degree from Catholic University of America Washington, D.C. and studied with Harvey Phillips.

Self left the Army Band in 1967. He was offered the position of Assistant Professor of Tuba at the University of Tennessee in Knoxville in 1969. In 1971, while still working at the University of Tennessee, Self began working on a Doctor of Musical Arts degree at the University of Southern California in Los Angeles. At USC, he studied under Tommy Johnson.

== Los Angeles ==
=== Studio career ===
Self performed at studios in Los Angeles, beginning in 1974. He recorded over 1,500 soundtracks for motion pictures and television. One of his most notable soundtrack credits is his performance on Close Encounters of the Third Kind. His performance was featured as the "voice of the mothership." Self can be heard as a soloist in Jurassic Park, Home Alone, Home Alone 2, Casper, Batteries Not Included, Sleepless in Seattle, and Dennis the Menace. He was the first call tubist for notable film composers including John Williams, James Newton Howard, John Debney, and James Horner. During his final years, Self performed on John Williams' scores for The Force Awakens, The Last Jedi, and The Rise of Skywalker. He often doubled on cimbasso for soundtrack work, particularly since the late 1990s.

=== Orchestral performances ===
Self held principal tuba positions with the Hollywood Bowl Orchestra (1991–2025), Pasadena Symphony (1975–2025), Pacific Symphony (1986–2025), Los Angeles Opera (1986–2025), and Opera Pacific (1987–2008). In his opera orchestra performances he played the cimbasso when required. Self was also a frequent substitute tubist with the Los Angeles Philharmonic.

=== Teaching ===
Self taught at the University of Southern California from 1976 to 2024. His retirement at USC was celebrated with a "Swan Song Concert". At USC, he taught tuba and coached brass chamber music. He taught at the University of Tennessee from 1969–1975. He also taught at the Music Academy of the West festival in Montecito, California and the Henry Mancini Institute.

=== Compositions ===
Self published over 90 solo, chamber, and symphonic works. In 2008, the Pacific Symphony performed his composition, Tour de Force: Episodes for Orchestra. The 13-minute work has been transcribed for wind ensemble and was co-premiered by the USC Thornton Wind Ensemble under the direction of H. Robert Reynolds and the IUP Wind Ensemble under the direction of Jack Stamp.

Self and his wife Jamie gave to his alma mater Indiana University of Pennsylvania, including funding the Legacy Brass Quintet, a brass quintet for honors students, and establishing the Jim & Jamie Self Brass Scholarship in 2023.

== Death ==
Self died in his Los Angeles home on November 2, 2025, at the age of 82.

== Awards ==
Harvey Phillips Award (ITEA), 2010.

Roger Bobo Award for Excellence in Recording (ITEA), 2008 – InnerPlay

Lifetime Achievement Award (ITEA), 2008

Distinguished Alumni Award, Indiana University of Pennsylvania, 2003

Most Valuable Player Award (Tuba), National Association of Recording Arts and Sciences, 1983, 1985, 1986, 1987

President, International Tuba Euphonium Association, 1979–1981

== Discography ==
Disc title	Year of release	Genre	Contributing artists
Children at Play	1983	Jazz	Jon Kurnick, Guitar; Ernie McDaniel, Bass; Harold Mason, Drums
New Stuff	1988	Jazz	Jon Kurnick, Guitar; Ernie McDaniel, Bass; Harold Mason, Drums
Tricky Lix	1991	Jazz	Gary Foster, Alto Sax; Warren Luening. Trumpet; Bill Booth, Trombone; Jon Kurnick, Guitar; Joel Hamilton, Bass; Alan Estes, Drums
Changing Colors	1995	Classical	Terry Trotter, Piano
The Basset Hound Blues	1997	Jazz	Pete Christlieb, Tenor sax; Terry Trotter, Piano; Tom Warrington, Bass; Steve Houghton, Drums; Stanley the Basset Hound, Vocals
The Big Stretch	1999	Classical	Tommy Johnson; Winston Morris; Gene Pokorny; Norm Pearson; Fred Greene; Doug Tornquist; Loren Marsteller; Malcolm McNab; David Duke; Bill Booth
My America	2003	Americana	Burnette Dillon, Trumpet; Bill Booth, Trombone; Gary Foster, Clarinet and Saxes; Mike Lang, Piano; Tim May, Banjos and Guitars; Dave Carpenter, Basses; Bernie Dresel, Drums; Joel Derouin, Violin; Armen Ksadjikian, Cello; Kim Scharnberg, Synthesizer; Brian Kilgore, Percussion; Chuck Niles, Narration
Size Matters	2003	Jazz	Bill Scarlett, Tenor Sax; Bill Swann, Piano; Taylor Coker, String Bass; Daryll Johnson, Drums
Inner Play	2005	Jazz	Gary Foster, Alto Sax, Bass Clarinet, Flute, Alto Flute; Pete Christlieb, Tenor Sax; Dan Higgins, Soprano/Alto/Tenor Saxes, Flute; Terry Trotter/Tom Ranier/Mike Lang, Pianos; Tom Warrington/Dave Carpenter/Ken Wild, Basses; Steve Houghton, Steve Schaeffer, Ralph Humphrey, Drums; Gayle Levant, Harp; Jim Fox, Acoustic/Electric Guitars; John Magnussen, Vibes, Percussion; Brian Kilgore, Percussion; Brad Dechter, Alto Sax; The Jay Rosen Strings
The Odd Couple	2008	Jazz	Ron Kalina, Harmonica; Larry Koonse, Guitar; Tom Warrington, Bass; Joe La Barbera, Drums
Concerto for Tuba and Orchestra	2012	Classical / Jazz	Hollywood Ensemble; Bill Cunliffe, Piano
'Tis the Season TUBA Jolly	2013	Christmas	Norm Pearson, tuba; Doug Tornquist, tuba; Dave Holben, tuba; Beth Mitchell, tuba; Scott Sutherland, tuba; Chuck Koontz, tuba; Blake Cooper, tuba; Steve Klein, tuba; Gary Hickman, tuba; Fred Greene, tuba; Alan Kaplan, euphonium; Alex Iles, euphonium; Bill Booth, euphonium; Bill Reichenbach, euphonium; Phil Keen, euphonium; James Miller, euphonium; Don Sawday, euphonium; Ken Kugler, euphonium; Brian Kilgore, percussion; Bernie Dresel, drums
Flying Circus	2015	Classical	Barry Perkins, trumpet; Tony Ellis, trumpet; Rob Frear, trumpet; Dave Wailes, trumpet; Daniel Rosenboom, trumpet; Marissa Benedict, trumpet; Malcom McNab, trumpet; John Lewis, trumpet; Keith Popejoy, horn; Jim Taylor, horn; Dylan Hart, horn; David Duke, horn; Mike Hoffman, trombone; Dave Stetson, trombone; Steve Suminski, trombone; Bill Booth, trombone; Doug Tornquist, tuba; Todd Miller, conductor
YO	2016	Latin Jazz	Ron Blake, flugelhorn and trumpet; Rob Hardt, flute and saxes; Francisco Torres, trombone; Andy Langham, piano; Rene Camacho, bass; Joey de Leon, bata, shekere, and timbales; Giancarlo Anderson, congas; George Ortiz, bongos
Floating in Winter	2017	Jazz	John Chiodini, guitar
Out on the Coast	2020	Jazz	David Angel, tenor sax and conducting; Phil Feather, saxes and flutes; Gene Cipriano “Cip”, saxes and clarinet; Jim Quam, tenor sax and clarinet; Tom Peterson, tenor sax and flutes; Bob Carr, baritone sax and bass clarinet; Jonathan Dane, trumpet and flugel horn; Ron Stout, trumpet and flugel horn; Stephanie O’Keefe, horn; Scott Whitfield, trombone; John Chiodini, jazz guitar; Susan Quam, string bass; Paul Kreibich, drums
The Light Fantastic	2020	Jazz	John Chiodini, guitar
Hangin' Out	2022	Jazz	John Chiodini, guitar
My America 2: Destinations	2022	Jazz	Kim Scharnberg, conductor; Ron Stout, trumpet and flugelhorn; Bill Booth, trombone and euphonium; Scott Whitfield, trombone; Phil Feather, alto saxophone and English horn; Tom Peterson, saxophones; John Chiodini, guitars; Steve Fister, guitars; Bill Cunliffe, piano and melodica; Ken Wild, basses; Kendall Kay, drums; Brian Kilgore, percussion
Touch and Go	2023	Jazz	John Chiodini, guitars; Ron Stout, trumpet; Ken Wild, bass; Kendall Kay, drums
Tour de Force	2024	Jazz	River City Brass Band; James Gourlay, conductor and tuba soloist; Zach Collins, tuba soloist
Feels So Good	2024	Jazz	John Chiodini, guitar; Steve Marsh, saxophone; Phil Feather, saxophone; Bill Booth, trombone; Kris Bergh, trumpet
