= David Bowe (actor) =

American actor (born 1964)

- Born: January 4, 1964 (age 62); Los Angeles, California, U.S.
- Occupation: Actor
- Years active: 1982–present
- Relatives: Rosemarie Bowe (aunt); Robert Stack (uncle)

David Bowe (born January 4, 1964) is an American character actor in film and television. His best-known role is that of George Newman's sidekick, Bob, in 1989's UHF. His other film credits include A Few Good Men (1992), Made in America (1993, starring Whoopi Goldberg), Heavyweights (1995), The Rock (1996), Kicking & Screaming (2005), and Rubber (2010).

Bowe also had a recurring role on the short-lived television series Life... and Stuff, which aired in 1997 and co-starred Andrea Martin.

== Personal life ==
Bowe was born in Los Angeles. Bowe is a nephew of Rosemarie Bowe and Robert Stack.

== Selected filmography ==
=== Film ===
Year	Title	Role	Notes
1987	Back to the Beach	Mountain	
1989	UHF	Bob Steckler/Bobbo the Clown	
1990	Air America	Saunders	
1990	Think Big	Security guard #1	
1990	The Adventures of Ford Fairlane	College boy	
1990	Masters of Menace	Sloppy Joe	
1991	For the Boys	Photographer	
1992	I Don't Buy Kisses Anymore	Norman Fishbine	
1992	A Few Good Men	Cdr. Gibbs	
1993	Made in America	Teddy	
1993	Malice	Dr. Matthew Robertson	
1993	Freaked	EES Assistant	
1994	Heaven Sent	Howard	
1994	Broken Record	Fleese	Short
1995	Heavyweights	Chris Donnelly	
1996	The Rock	Dr. Ling	
1996	The Cable Guy	Helicopter Paramedic	
1997	The Shadow Men	Harry	
2001	Panic	Co-Pilot	
2001	Ablaze	Rick Woods	Direct-to-video
2001	The Shrink Is In	Richard	
2003	Cheaper by the Dozen	TV interviewer	
2003	Grind	Registration Clerk	
2005	Kicking & Screaming	Forest Avery	
2005	Checking Out	Allen	
2007	The Wondering Kind	Irate Diner	Short
2008	Drillbit Taylor	Male teacher	
2009	Transformers: Revenge of the Fallen	Smithsonian Guard	
2009	Divorce Sale	Johnny	Short
2010	Rubber	Mr. Hughes	
2011	Mitzvah Communion	Clarke Reed	Short

=== Television ===
Year	Title	Role	Notes
1982	Alice	Customer	1 episode
1986	Highway to Heaven	Frank Worton (Young)	1 episode
1988	Maybe Baby	Mark	TV movie
1988	CBS Summer Playhouse	Jerry	1 episode
1989	Wedding Band	Max	1 episode
1989	Family Ties	Neil Cooper	1 episode; uncredited
1989	My Boyfriend's Back	Eddy	TV movie
1989	Alien Nation	Buster Keaton	1 episode
1990	Red Pepper	Leo	TV movie
1990	Sisters	David Landon	TV movie
1991	Stat	Dr. Neff	1 episode
1991	Thirtysomething	Robert Gould Shaw	1 episode
1992	Live! From Death Row	Durbin	TV movie
1992	Dream On	Bruce	1 episode
1992	Hangin' with Mr. Cooper	Security guard	1 episode
1993	Down the Shore	Rush	2 episodes
1994	Time Trax	Mitch's partner	1 episode
1991, 1994	The Fresh Prince of Bel-Air	Jerry DeCarlo / Director	2 episodes
1995	Lois & Clark: The New Adventures of Superman	Dr. Harry Leit	1 episode
1995	Robin's Hoods		
1995	18 Minutes in Albuquerque	Jonathan Daye	TV short
1995	The Nanny	Fran's date	1 episode
1995	Living Single	Ray Brunger	1 episode
1995–1997	Beverly Hills, 90210	Garrett Slan / Warren	4 episodes
1996	In the House	Daniel	1 episode
1997	The Jamie Foxx Show	Producer	1 episode
1997	Sleeping with the Devil	Dr. Jerrold Petrofsky	TV movie
1997	The Weird Al Show	Miner	1 episode
1997	Night Man	J. Edgar Hoover	1 episode
1997	Life... and Stuff	Andy Boswell	4 episodes
1997–1999	Silk Stalkings	Burmeister	3 episodes
1998	Star Trek: Deep Space Nine	Basso	1 episode
1998	The Larry Sanders Show	Jimmy Franks	1 episode
1998	L.A. Doctors	Robert Brooks	1 episode
1998, 2001	The Practice	Mr. Reed / School Attorney	2 episodes
1998, 1999, 2002	Felicity	Jerry / Lloyd / Photographer	3 episodes
1999	The X-Files	Robert Werther	1 episode; "Trevor"
1999	Late Last Night	Guy at Club	TV movie
2000	Freaks and Geeks	Salesman	1 episode
2000	Diagnosis: Murder	Larry Larson	1 episode
2000	Zoe, Duncan, Jack and Jane	Stewart	1 episode
2000	Python	Boone	TV movie
2001	Yes, Dear	Bill	1 episode
2001	Rugrats	Ticket Taker / Judge	1 episode; voice
2002	They Shoot Divas, Don't They?	Jay	TV movie
2003	American Dreams		
2003	Mystery Woman	Mike Landry	TV movie
2004	Life with Bonnie	Bruce Chevillat	1 episode
2005	CSI: Crime Scene Investigation	Phil Boyd	1 episode
2005	Cold Case	Larry Papas 1977	1 episode
2005	McBride: The Doctor Is Out... Really Out	Leo	TV movie
2006	Criminal Minds	Kruger Spence	1 episode
2006	Where There's a Will	Reverend Stevens	TV movie
2007	The Winner	Dr. Gordon	1 episode
2007	House	Doug	1 episode; "The Jerk"
2008	ER	Father of Unicycle Boy	1 episode
2008	Mad Men	Dr. Adams	1 episode; "For Those Who Think Young"
2008	Boston Legal	Jeffrey Addario	1 episode
2008	Little Britain USA		1 episode
2009	Entourage	Scott	1 episode
2009	Castle	Max Haverstock	1 episode
2009	Grey's Anatomy	Don	1 episode; "Invasion"
2009	Bones	Howard Fileman	1 episode
2011	Harry's Law	Bernard Layton	1 episode
2011	Days of Our Lives	Reverend Smyth	2 episodes
2011	Meter Men	Hugo Tripe	TV movie
2011	The Mentalist	Brady Walton	1 episode
2013	The Breakdown	Frank	TV movie
2018	9-1-1	Dr. Gordon	1 episode
2019	PEN15	Albert	3 episodes
2019	The Goldbergs	Scott	1 episode
2019	American Horror Story: 1984	Detective	1 episode; "True Killers"
2019	Black-ish	Stranger #1	1 episode
2019	Shameless	Bob / Bob Tamietti	5 episodes
2020	Dirty John	Ronald P. Ollen	1 episode
