= Smells Like Nirvana =

1992 single by "Weird Al" Yankovic

Single by "Weird Al" Yankovic

from the album Off the Deep End
- B-side: "Waffle King"
- Released: April 3, 1992
- Recorded: January 27, 1992
- Studio: Santa Monica Sound (Santa Monica, California)
- Genre: Grunge; comedy rock
- Length: 3:42
- Label: Scotti Brothers
- Songwriters: Kurt Cobain; Dave Grohl; Krist Novoselic; "Weird Al" Yankovic
- Producer: "Weird Al" Yankovic

"Weird Al" Yankovic singles chronology
"Isle Thing" (1989)	"Smells Like Nirvana" (1992)	"You Don't Love Me Anymore" (1992)

Music video
- "Smells Like Nirvana" on YouTube

"Smells Like Nirvana" is a song written and performed by American musician "Weird Al" Yankovic as a parody of Nirvana's song "Smells Like Teen Spirit". It was released as the lead single from his Off the Deep End album in April 1992. "Smells Like Nirvana" was written during a three-year career low for Yankovic after the financial failure of his film UHF, but captured the quickly-rising popularity of grunge and Nirvana's success. The song was written to poke fun at Nirvana singer Kurt Cobain's unintelligible lyrics in the original song. After being unable to contact Nirvana conventionally, Yankovic called Cobain while the band was on the set of Saturday Night Live, where Cobain quickly gave permission to record the parody.

Recording the song was a change for Yankovic and his band. Usually, the group was forced to record several overdubs. "Smells Like Nirvana", however, was relatively straightforward in its musical composition. To promote the single, Yankovic created an associated video for the song that parodied and closely mirrored the original "Smells Like Teen Spirit" video, even going so far as to hire several of the same actors and use the same set.

"Smells Like Nirvana" was met with critical praise and helped to re-energize Yankovic's career. Dave Grohl of Nirvana said Yankovic's parody enabled them to recognize the success their band had achieved. The song is one of Yankovic's most successful singles and was his second top 40 hit in the United States, reaching number 35 on both the Billboard Hot 100 and the U.S. Mainstream Rock Tracks. The song's video was nominated for a 1992 MTV Video Music Award for Best Male Video.

== Background ==
Prior to writing "Smells Like Nirvana", Yankovic's music career had suffered from the poor financial performance of his 1989 feature film, UHF and the associated soundtrack. Yankovic called that "the beginning of three years where it was kind of hard for me to recover". He started work on a new studio album around 1990. To revitalize his career, he considered creating a parody of a Michael Jackson song, which had proven successful twice before with "Eat It" and "Fat". He had composed a parody of Jackson's "Black or White", titled "Snack All Night", but Jackson said he was uncomfortable with the parody, given that the original song, with its anti-racist message, was intended to be a serious political work. Yankovic would later believe that Jackson's refusal was, retrospectively, a blessing; he felt that "Snack All Night" was not one of his better works. While he had compiled other original songs for a new album, he feared the lack of a good parody song would doom the album to failure and held off from releasing anything until an idea presented itself.

The band Nirvana started to become popular in the music scene at the time, creating "big, seismic shifts in pop culture" according to Yankovic. Yankovic felt that the band's 1991 album Nevermind, which featured "Smells Like Teen Spirit", was "really great", but feared that at its release the band was not popular enough to warrant a parody. By early 1992, Nevermind had reached platinum certification and led the Billboard charts, which led Yankovic to start working on a parody. Yankovic decided to base his parody on the publicity around Nevermind, much of which dealt with the inability to comprehend the songs' lyrics, both in their phrasing and the manner in which they were sung by lead vocalist Kurt Cobain. He noted, "I try not to go the obvious route all the time, but sometimes the most obvious is actually the best." Yankovic had initial difficulty getting permission for the parody, as his manager claimed he was unable to contact the group numerous times. When Yankovic learned that Nirvana would be performing on the January 11, 1992, show of Saturday Night Live, he called his UHF co-star, Victoria Jackson, at the time a regular cast member of the show. Jackson managed to give the phone to Cobain so that Yankovic could make his request. Cobain agreed, though initially he inquired if the song would be about food, a common theme in many of Yankovic's songs. Yankovic explained that the song would be about Cobain's incomprehensible lyrics, to which Cobain replied, according to Yankovic, "Oh, sure, of course, that's funny."

== Recording and lyrics ==
"Smells Like Nirvana" (sample)
"Smells Like Nirvana", from Yankovic's 1992 album Off the Deep End. The sample illustrates the verse, pre-chorus, and chorus of Yankovic's parody which is a musical re-creation of the original Nirvana song.

Recorded around January 27, 1992, at Santa Monica Sound Records, in Santa Monica, California, the song was the final one recorded for the album, as Yankovic generally records the songs that will be released as singles last. Recording took between three and four days. The band worked to match the same fluctuating tempos that were in the original song; Jon Schwartz, Yankovic's drummer, noted that "the [drum] part was pretty loose. [...] Tempos were up and down. We adjusted the tempos on our song to meet the Nirvana version. It's by no means steady." Compared to previous parodies, where upwards of 20-some instruments had to be mixed together, the simpler composition of "Teen Spirit" made it much easier for the band to complete the song.

Yankovic later noted that recording the song's vocals was particularly difficult, because he was singing "for eight to 12 hours a day", which caused strain on his vocal cords. For the verse where Yankovic mumbles the lyrics to the song, he placed several cookies in his mouth to achieve the garbled effect. During the parody's musical interlude, Yankovic gargled water to the tune of the original's guitar solo. The solo also features kazoos and a tuba, with the latter being played by Tommy Johnson.

Lyrically, "Smells Like Nirvana" pokes fun at the original song's difficult-to-understand lyrics. The opening verse begins "What is this song/All about?/Can't figure any lyrics out", and at one point Yankovic purposely garbles the lyrics: "It's hard to bargle nawdle zouss [sic]/With all these marbles in my mouth". He admitted in an interview that he had previously woke up "in the middle of the night" and wrote down the phrase "bargle nawdle zouss", thinking that it would "be important someday."

== Music video ==
The music video, directed by Yankovic's manager Jay Levey, is a near shot-for-shot parody of the original video for "Smells Like Teen Spirit", which depicts the band playing at a high school concert while it descends into riot. Yankovic is present on guitar and vocals as Kurt Cobain, with Steve Jay on bass as Krist Novoselic, and Jon "Bermuda" Schwartz on drums as Dave Grohl. All three wear clothing and long-haired wigs to imitate the look of Nirvana in "Smells Like Teen Spirit". Yankovic's video uses many of the same props, actors and camera angles; in particular, the video was shot in the same Culver City, California sound stage as Nirvana's video, several of the cheerleaders and audience members were from the original video, and Tony De La Rosa reprises his role as the janitor. Levey said that they were able to recreate much of the same setting with help of the producers of the original Nirvana video once they were aware that the song had Cobain's blessing. Levey had a brief conversation with Samuel Bayer, the original director of "Smells Like Teen Spirit" in preparation for the video shoot. Although Levey noted that "he was certainly going along with it", he felt that Bayer was "the least enthused" because "he was a true artíste".

The video includes actor Dick Van Patten in a guest role. Van Patten, being one of the few celebrities that could be reached through immediate contacts, was a last-minute addition by Yankovic. According to Yankovic, Van Patten became "kind of [their] good luck charm", and he would appear in a few of Yankovic's future videos. Professional skateboarder Tony Hawk also appears as one of the many extras as a result of the Birdhouse Skateboards team providing "skater/punks" for the video, although Yankovic was not aware of this until a 2009 Twitter post by Hawk. Schwartz attempted to recreate Grohl's wild headbanging during filming, leaving him with a stiff neck several days afterward.

== Reception ==
=== Release and reception ===
The single for "Smells Like Nirvana" was released on April 2, 1992, while the album containing it, Off the Deep End, saw its release on April 14, 1992. The single was backed with a song called "Waffle King", a song detailing a man who becomes famous through making waffles and ends up letting the fame get to his head. This song was originally intended to appear on Off the Deep End, but was excluded due to Yankovic's fear that the song "I Was Only Kidding" would have a lyric that would not be funny by the time the following album was released. While the song later ended up on the following album, Alapalooza, Yankovic put it as the b-side to "Smells Like Nirvana" "in case there wasn't going to be a next album".

The single charted on several Billboard charts, making it Yankovic's most successful single since his single "Eat It", which charted in 1984. The song debuted on the Billboard Hot 100 on April 25, 1992. It peaked at number 35 and remained on the chart for two weeks. The single also charted on the Hot Mainstream Rock Tracks, also peaking at number 35. The single was also popular in the other countries. In Canada, the single charted at number 48. In the United Kingdom, the single entered the charts on April 7, 1992, and peaked at number 58, spending only one week on the charts. In Australia, "Smells Like Nirvana" was released on June 14, 1992, and spent six weeks on the charts. It peaked at number 24.

After its release, "Smells Like Nirvana" was considered, at the time, the largest comeback in Yankovic's career. The song was well-received by the media. AllMusic reviewer Barry Weber wrote that the song illustrated "the kind of brilliant writing Yankovic was still capable of doing". Anthony Violanti, a reporter for The Buffalo News, called the song "the high point" of one of Yankovic's concerts. Nirvana famously enjoyed the parody. Cobain is claimed to have only considered Nirvana to have "made it" with the success of Yankovic's parody. In personal journals published after his 1994 suicide, he called Yankovic "America's modern pop-rock genious [sic]". Grohl is also reported to have realized his band was truly successful when Yankovic asked for permission to record the parody. According to an executive for Nirvana's label, DGC Records, "Smells Like Nirvana" was responsible for selling an additional million copies of Nirvana's album Nevermind. The video was nominated for the 1992 MTV Video Awards for "Best Male Video", although it did not win. At the awards ceremony, Nirvana was initially asked to perform, but they declined. The offer was then extended to Yankovic, before Nirvana relented. Yankovic later joked that "I might've been a bargaining chip".

=== Legacy ===
After Cobain died by suicide in 1994, Yankovic and his band were hesitant to play the extremely popular "Smells Like Nirvana" during live shows. For several months after Cobain's death, Yankovic would first perform a somber tribute to Cobain prior to playing the song itself. Shortly after Cobain's death, Yankovic was scheduled to play a show in Seattle, where Nirvana first became famous. Due to this connection, Yankovic was hesitant to perform the spoof, as he worried about how the audience might react to the parody. However, Yankovic was urged by journalists to go through with the performance, as they said that the song would be "cathartic" for the area. Ultimately, the performance "went over extremely well". Yankovic continues to play "Smells Like Nirvana" live, stating that "Kurt was a fan of the song" and "he would have wanted it that way."

In The Simpsons episode "That '90s Show", set primarily in flashback to the 1990s, Homer Simpson is shown creating one of the first grunge bands while trying to cope with Marge's infidelity; the band, called "Sadgasm", becomes highly popular. At one point, Homer writes a new song called "Shave Me"—itself a loose parody of Nirvana's real single "Rape Me". Homer's song is then parodied as "Brainfreeze" in both song and video by "Weird Al" Yankovic, who voices himself. Homer takes Yankovic's parody as a sign that his band has become successful, but his depressed state after breaking up with Marge leaves him unable to enjoy the song's humor; he gloomily bemoans, "He who is tired of Weird Al, is tired of life". The sequence of events was written to parallel much of the history of "Smells Like Nirvana", including Kurt Cobain's reaction to the parody.

== Live performances ==
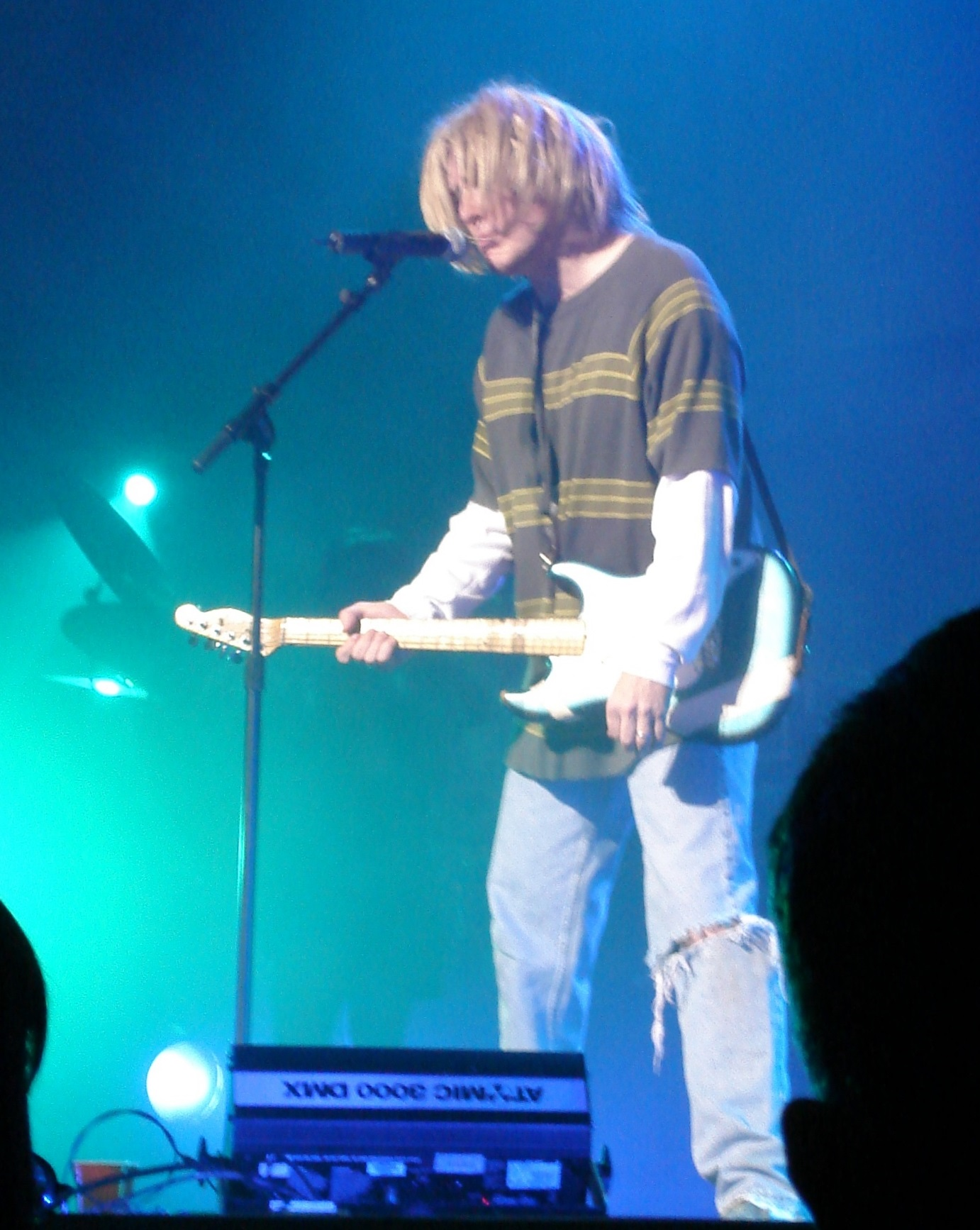
"Weird Al" Yankovic performing "Smells Like Nirvana" in concert, dressed like Kurt Cobain

During live performances, Yankovic dons clothing similar to what Cobain wore in the video for "Smells Like Teen Spirit". This includes a right-handed guitar strung upside down (a common solution for left-handed guitarists like Cobain), a shirt similar to Cobain's, and a blonde wig. The costuming for the performance is critical; Schwartz explained that "if anything's missing, Al won't do it". The rest of Al's band also participates. Steve Jay, who plays bass, uses two bass straps to emulate and exaggerate "Novoselic's low-hanging bass". He explained that he positions his instrument "to where I can just barely touch the strings". The members of the band also mock-mosh. Jim West, the band's guitarist, noted that moshing is usually tame, but that there "were a few collisions where people got hurt, but not the audience, just the band." A couple of local female dancers also accompany Al and his band performing cheerleading routines. Sometimes during the third verse, after Yankovic sings "And I forgot the next verse," he drops out for the next few lines, pretending to actually forget the lyrics.

== Track listing ==
US pressing

1. "Smells Like Nirvana" – 3:42
2. "Trigger Happy" – 3:46
3. "Waffle King" – 4:26

US cassette single

1. "Smells Like Nirvana" – 3:42
2. "Waffle King" – 4:26

== Personnel ==
- "Weird Al" Yankovic – vocals, background vocals, production, arrangement
- Jim West – guitar
- Steve Jay – bass guitar
- Jon "Bermuda" Schwartz – drums
- Tommy Johnson – tuba
- Tony Papa – engineering

== Charts ==
Chart performance for "Smells Like Nirvana"
Chart (1992)	Peak position
Australia (ARIA)	24
Canadian RPM Top Singles	48
New Zealand Singles Chart	4
Swedish Singles Chart	38
UK Singles Chart	58
US Billboard Hot 100	35
US Hot Mainstream Rock Tracks (Billboard)	35
US Cash Box Top 100	22

== Certifications ==
Certifications for "Smells Like Nirvana"
Region	Certification	Certified units/sales
Australia (ARIA)	Gold	35,000^{^}
^{^} Shipments figures based on certification alone.
