= Alan Baer =

American tuba player

- Born: United States
- Education: Indiana University of Pennsylvania; Cleveland Institute of Music; University of Southern California
- Occupation: Tuba player

Alan Baer is an American tuba player who is Principal Tuba for the New York Philharmonic. He has also been principal tuba with several other orchestras including the Milwaukee Symphony Orchestra, and Louisiana Philharmonic Orchestra. In addition, he has performed and recorded with the Cleveland Orchestra led by Vladimir Ashkenazy, performances with the Peninsula Music Festival of Wisconsin, New Orleans Symphony, Los Angeles Concert Orchestra, Ojai Festival Orchestra (California), Los Angeles Philharmonic, and Chicago Symphony Orchestra. He has performed as a featured soloist, touring several countries in Europe, including Switzerland, Austria, Germany, and France.

== Education and teaching ==
Baer studied with Dr. Gary Bird at Indiana University of Pennsylvania. He completed his bachelor of music degree with Ronald Bishop at the Cleveland Institute of Music, and has done graduate work at the University of Southern California, Cleveland Institute of Music, and California State University, Long Beach, where he studied with Tommy Johnson. While in Long Beach, Baer taught at California State University, where he also directed the university tuba ensemble and the brass choir. In Milwaukee, Baer was an adjunct professor of tuba and euphonium at the University of Wisconsin–Milwaukee and director of the Tuba-Euphonium Ensemble. Baer serves on the faculty of the Juilliard School and Manhattan School of Music in New York City, as well as the Mason Gross School of the Arts at Rutgers University in New Jersey.

In addition to performing and teaching, Baer is a design consultant with the Meinl-Weston instrument manufacturer.

== Discography ==
- Song and Dance (CD) (2008)
- Coast to Coast (CD) (2005)

== Other publications ==
- Tonic/Dominant Scales for Tuba with Piano Accompaniment CD, Compiled by: Alan Baer, Piano Accompaniment by: Noreen Baer
- Cross-Training Scales for Tuba, Compiled by: Alan Baer
