= Stanley Brock =

American film and television actor (1931-1991)

- Brock in The Rockford Files, 1979
- Born: Stanley Eis; July 7, 1931; Brooklyn, New York, U.S.
- Died: January 25, 1991 (aged 59); Los Angeles, California, U.S.
- Occupations: Film and television actor

Stanley Eis (July 7, 1931 – January 25, 1991), known professionally as Stanley Brock, was an American film and television actor. He was best known for playing George Newman's uncle Harvey Bilchik in the 1989 film UHF.

Brock guest-starred in numerous television programs, including Baretta, One Day at a Time, Charlie's Angels, Happy Days, Knots Landing, Hill Street Blues, The A-Team, Quantum Leap, Night Court, The Rockford Files and Highway to Heaven, and played the recurring role of vigilante Bruno Binder in the ABC sitcom television series Barney Miller. He also played Howie Hoffstedder in the NBC soap opera television series Days of Our Lives. He also appeared in films such as Three Fugitives, The Devil and Max Devlin, Billy Jack Goes to Washington, St. Ives, Tin Men and My Chauffeur.

Brock died on January 25, 1991, at the age of 59, of a heart attack in Los Angeles, California.
