= Norman Pearson (tubist) =

American tuba player (born 1957)

Norman W. Pearson (born 1957/58) is an American orchestral tuba player. who was principal tubist with the Los Angeles Philharmonic Orchestra from 1993 to 2020.

== Life and career ==
Prior to his appointment with the Los Angeles Philharmonic Norman Pearson was a freelance musician in the Los Angeles area and performed regularly with the Pacific Symphony, Joffrey Ballet, Los Angeles Music Center Opera and the Los Angeles Chamber Orchestra. He attended the University of Southern California, studying under Tommy Johnson, where he received a bachelor's degree in music. He also has recorded for most of the major Hollywood motion picture and television studios. He currently teaches at the Colburn School and the University of Southern California.
