= Liberty Alliance LLC =

American Christian website media company

Liberty Alliance
- Company type: Privately held company
- Industry: Misinformation
- Founded: 2008
- Defunct: 2017
- Headquarters: Atlanta, Georgia, United States
- Area served: United States
- Products: Christian websites, publishing, media

Liberty Alliance was a private United States company with its headquarters in Atlanta, Georgia. It operated a collection of conservative and Christian websites.

In August 2012, Inc. magazine ranked Liberty Alliance number 576 on its sixth annual Inc. 5000, which is a ranking of the nation's fastest-growing private companies. It was also ranked number 12 in the fastest-growing top media companies category and ranked the 20th fastest-growing private company in the Atlanta, Georgia area.

The Liberty Alliance publishes books through an imprint called White Hall.

== History ==
The company was founded following the 2008 United States presidential election to oppose the policies of President Barack Obama. During the 2012 United States presidential election, it participated in a grassroots effort to oppose Obama's election by placing sticky notes at various gas stations criticizing the increased price of gasoline since he took office.

During the 2016 United States presidential election, the company became active in promoting the election of President Donald Trump. It primarily used Facebook, creating 176 different pages to promote conservative ideas and Trump's candidacy. Writers for the company wrote articles which were then linked to from the company's Facebook pages. A report in The Financial Times cited the company as an example of the misinformation spreading online during the campaign. The company closed in 2017.

== Company leadership ==
- Brandon Vallorani, founder
- Jared Vallorani, chief executive officer
- Tracey Lee, chief financial officer
- Kenny Rudd, business manager
- Joe Weathers, VP, marketing
- Ted Slater, VP, website development
