= Money for Nothing/Beverly Hillbillies* =

1989 single by "Weird Al" Yankovic

Single by "Weird Al" Yankovic

from the album UHF – Original Motion Picture Soundtrack and Other Stuff
- B-side: "Generic Blues"
- Released: August 8, 1989
- Recorded: December 20, 1988
- Genre: Comedy rock
- Length: 3:10
- Label: Scotti Brothers
- Songwriters: Mark Knopfler; Gordon Sumner; Paul Henning; Al Yankovic
- Producer: Rick Derringer

"Weird Al" Yankovic singles chronology
| "UHF" (1989) | "Money for Nothing/Beverly Hillbillies*" (1989) | "Isle Thing" (1989) |

Audio sample
- file; help

Music video
- "Money for Nothing/Beverly Hillbillies*" on YouTube

"Money for Nothing/Beverly Hillbillies*" is a song by "Weird Al" Yankovic. It is a cover of "Money for Nothing" by Dire Straits with the lyrics replaced by those of The Beverly Hillbillies theme song. The music video, which appeared as part of Yankovic's film UHF, is a parody of the "Money for Nothing" music video.

== Composition ==
The song features Dire Straits members Mark Knopfler on guitar and Guy Fletcher on synthesizer, Knopfler's one condition for allowing the parody. Jim West, Yankovic's own guitarist, then practiced the song for weeks. As a result of that and because Knopfler had become more relaxed after having played it for several years, West's version sounded more like the original version.

The song is credited to Mark Knopfler and Sting (writers of the original "Money for Nothing") and Paul Henning (writer of "The Ballad of Jed Clampett").

== Track listing ==
1. "Money for Nothing/Beverly Hillbillies*" – 3:10
2. "Generic Blues" – 4:35

== Title negotiation ==
Originally the title of the song was going to be simply "Beverly Hillbillies"; however, the title of the song was changed to "Money for Nothing/Beverly Hillbillies*" (with an asterisk), and it is legally copyrighted and registered as such. Yankovic commented on the legal complications with the titling of the song in the DVD audio commentary for the film UHF, explaining: "We had to name that song 'Money for Nothing "slash" Beverly Hillbillies "asterisk"' because the lawyers told us that had to be the name. Those wacky lawyers! Whatcha gonna do?" Yankovic also gave the following comment on his official website in regard to the title: "That incredibly stupid name is what the lawyers insisted that the parody be listed as. I'm not sure why, and I've obviously never been very happy about it."

== Music video ==
The music video for "Money for Nothing/Beverly Hillbillies*" was done in the same style as the original and is featured in Yankovic's 1989 feature film UHF. However, several concepts were parodied.

- In the opening of the original video, a skinny, computer-generated man (who "lip syncs" Sting's vocals) is watching television. In the parody, this character is modeled after George Newman (Yankovic's character in UHF).
- The live action scenes are similar to the original, including partially rotoscoped-animation in bright neon colors, light emitting from the lead singer's head, and the "invisible man" playing the guitar.
- In the original, a portly blue-collar worker is shown "lip syncing" to Knopfler's vocals. In the parody, this character is modeled on the Jed Clampett character from Beverly Hillbillies.
- A short live-action clip displays the song as "The Ballad of Jed Clampett" by George Newman (Yankovic's character in UHF).
- David Silverman, later of Simpsons fame, designed the characters seen in the animated music video.
- In the original videos, the guitars simply have neon-styled effects added to them. In the parody, one of the guitars is made to twist as if it were solely neon lights.
- The original video features frequent camera cuts centered at Mark Knopfler in the final verse. This sequence is parodied in Yankovic's video during the first verse with him noticing the camera is cutting around him, constantly losing track of it before finally grabbing it and holding it in place himself.

== See also ==
- List of singles by "Weird Al" Yankovic
- List of songs by "Weird Al" Yankovic
