= Off the Deep End =

Studio album by "Weird Al" Yankovic
- Released: April 14, 1992
- Recorded: June 6, 1990 – January 27, 1992
- Studios: Santa Monica Sound Recorders, Santa Monica
- Genres: Comedy, comedy rock
- Length: 41:18
- Labels: Rock 'n Roll Records; Scotti Brothers
- Producer: "Weird Al" Yankovic

"Weird Al" Yankovic chronology
UHF – Original Motion Picture Soundtrack and Other Stuff (1989)	Off the Deep End (1992)	The Food Album (1993)

Singles from Off the Deep End
- 1. "Smells Like Nirvana" Released: April 3, 1992; 2. "You Don't Love Me Anymore" Released: June 19, 1992

Off the Deep End is the seventh studio album by the American parody musician "Weird Al" Yankovic, released in 1992. This album was the first album self-produced by Yankovic, after six albums with Rick Derringer. Recorded between June 1990 and January 1992, the album was a follow-up to the unsuccessful soundtrack to Yankovic's 1989 film UHF. Off the Deep End and its lead single "Smells Like Nirvana" helped to revitalize Yankovic's career after a lull following his last hit single, "Fat", in 1988.

The musical styles on Off the Deep End are built around parodies and pastiches of pop and rock music of the late 1980s and early 1990s, including the newly arisen grunge movement. Half of the album is made up of parodies of Nirvana, MC Hammer, New Kids on the Block, Gerardo, and Milli Vanilli. The other half of the album is original material, featuring many "style parodies", or musical imitations of existing artists. These style parodies include imitations of specific artists like the Beach Boys, James Taylor and Jan and Dean.

Off the Deep End was met with mostly positive reviews and peaked at number 17 on the Billboard 200. The album also produced one of Yankovic's most famous singles, "Smells Like Nirvana", a parody of Nirvana's major rock hit "Smells Like Teen Spirit", which peaked at number 35 on the Billboard Hot 100. This song was Yankovic's second-highest charting single, after "Eat It", which was released in 1984. The cover also parodies the cover of Nirvana's album, Nevermind. The original had a naked baby in the water with a dollar bill cast by a fishing rod; Yankovic's replaced the baby with himself, and the dollar bill with a donut. Off the Deep End was Yankovic's fourth Gold record, and went on to be certified Platinum for sales of over one million copies in the United States. In addition, the album was later nominated for a Grammy Award for Best Comedy Recording in 1993.

== Production ==
=== Background ===
In 1989, Yankovic starred in a full-length feature film, co-written by himself and manager Jay Levey, and filmed in Tulsa, Oklahoma, called UHF. A satire of the television and film industries, also starring Michael Richards, Fran Drescher, and Victoria Jackson, it brought floundering studio Orion their highest test scores since the movie RoboCop. The movie was considered unsuccessful, only just making back its budget ($6 million at the box office compared to a budget of $5 million).

Yankovic also released a quasi-soundtrack for the film in late 1989, entitled UHF – Original Motion Picture Soundtrack and Other Stuff, which featured songs (and commercials) from the movie as well as new unrelated studio material from Yankovic. The album failed to be successful, charting at only 146 on the Billboard 200 and quickly falling off. After the release of UHF, Yankovic returned to the studio to record his follow-up album.

=== Originals ===
On June 6, 1990, recording for Off the Deep End officially began at Santa Monica Sound Recorders, in Santa Monica, California. The first recording session started with "Airline Amy". These recording sessions marked the first time Yankovic self-produced his songs, after six albums with Rick Derringer. The producer and musician had parted ways because Derringer found that Yankovic would not listen to his input, and Yankovic came to realize that he could do most of the production work himself. Subsequent studio albums would be produced by Yankovic. In regards to this split, Yankovic said: "We [i.e. Yankovic and his band] had a great run with Rick, he's a terrific guy—but I had become more and more of a control freak over the years, and I'd finally gotten to the point in my recording career where I felt that I could capably hold the reins all by myself." By late 1990 five originals—"Airline Amy", "Trigger Happy", "When I Was Your Age", "You Don't Love Me Anymore", and "Waffle King"—were recorded.

"You Don't Love Me Anymore" (sample)
"You Don't Love Me Anymore", from Yankovic's 1992 album Off the Deep End. Although the song is, musically, an original composition, the music video is a parody of "More Than Words" by Extreme.

"You Don't Love Me Anymore" was one of the last original songs recorded during the 1990 sessions. The song is written as a soft acoustic ballad. However, the lyrics are of a—literally—destructive relationship between Yankovic and an unnamed girl. Although they were formerly in love, the "flames died down" and they are no longer passionate—in fact the girl hates Yankovic to such an extent that she repeatedly attempts to kill him. In 1992, when the album was finally released, Yankovic desired to release the song as a single. His record label, Scotti Brothers, allowed it under the stipulation that the music video be a parody of another music video. "You Don't Love Me Anymore" was subsequently released to radio on June 19, 1992. While the song was an original composition, the video was a parody of "More Than Words" by Extreme. Yankovic later explained that when the song was released, many people erroneously believed it was a parody of "More Than Words", and thus, Yankovic crafted the music video to be a parody of the song. The single received moderate radio attention, which surprised Yankovic, because he had always thought that radio stations "usually just go for the parodies".

One of the original songs recorded in the 1990 sessions was "Waffle King". However, when Yankovic resumed recording in 1992, he recorded a new original called "I Was Only Kidding". Originally, "Waffle King" was supposed to appear on Off the Deep End. However, by the time the recording of the parodies for this album began, Al had written all the original songs that were to appear on his next album, Alapalooza. Because he was concerned that one of the jokes from the song "I Was Only Kidding" might be dated by the time his next album would finally be released—a line that references the movie Wayne's World: "I really love you... not!"—Yankovic included "I Was Only Kidding" on Off the Deep End in place of "Waffle King". "Waffle King" was instead used as the b-side of the "Smells Like Nirvana" single and would later resurface on Alapalooza.

The album also contains a hidden track at the end called "Bite Me". The "song", which consists of several seconds of loud music and Yankovic screaming, appears after 10 minutes of silence following "You Don't Love Me Anymore". According to Yankovic, the song was supposed to "come on [...] and scare you to death". Later pressings of Off the Deep End by Volcano and pressings outside the USA took away the hidden track and silence. The track is a nod to Nirvana: pressings of Nevermind featured the hidden track "Endless, Nameless".

=== Parodies and polka ===
After recording the first batch of originals in 1990, Yankovic focused his attention on parodies. By early 1991, only three parodies had been recorded. Two of them, the cookie-inspired New Kids on the Block parody "The White Stuff" and the television-centric MC Hammer parody "I Can't Watch This", were slated to be released as singles. In fact, several cartons of promo singles were pressed, but they were deleted from the record company's catalogue at the last minute. These CDs were later discovered by Yankovic and his drummer, Jon "Bermuda" Schwartz, in a trash heap and have since become collector's items. "The Plumbing Song", a double parody of Milli Vanilli's hit singles "Baby Don't Forget My Number" and "Blame It on the Rain" was also recorded. In a 1992 interview with Dr. Demento, Yankovic said that he believed the parody to be "kind of redundant" at that point in time, given the lip-synching scandal that had effectively destroyed the band almost two years prior. In reference to this scandal, Yankovic also jokingly affirmed that he did indeed sing lead vocals on his parody.

Yankovic waited for almost two years for the next "big thing" to emerge. "I don't have any really good reason why it took so long other than the fact that I was waiting for Michael Jackson's new album to come out," Yankovic explained. Unfortunately for Yankovic, the new album hit several snags. On November 26, 1991, Michael Jackson's new album, Dangerous was released. After hearing the hit single "Black or White", Yankovic approached Jackson about a potential parody entitled "Snack All Night". Although Jackson was a big supporter of Yankovic's work, he felt that a parody might be inappropriate, due to "Black or White" being about racial issues. Jackson told Yankovic that he could, if he wanted to, parody another song off his album, but just not "Black or White".

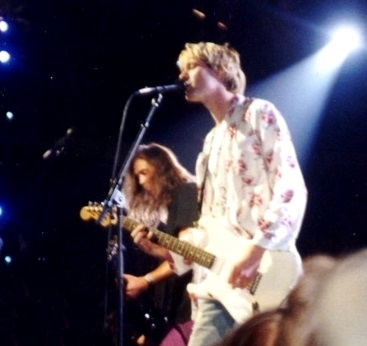
Nirvana felt that they had "made it" when Yankovic parodied "Smells Like Teen Spirit". (1992, P.B. Rage)

Yankovic soon turned his attention in another direction. Guns N' Roses had just released a version of Wings's 1970s hit "Live and Let Die". Yankovic approached Paul McCartney, leader of Wings, about a parody idea entitled "Chicken Pot Pie". Although McCartney was a supporter of Yankovic's work and he wanted to give Yankovic the chance to parody one of his songs, he begrudgingly turned him down due to the fact that, as a vegetarian, he could not condone the eating of animal flesh. Yankovic, a fellow vegetarian, has stated that he respects McCartney's decision.

"Smells Like Nirvana" (sample)
"Smells Like Nirvana", from Yankovic's 1992 album Off the Deep End. The sample illustrates the verse, pre-chorus, and chorus of Yankovic's parody which is a musical re-creation of the original Nirvana song.

It was around this time that Nirvana's Nevermind was making waves in the rock and pop scene. As the popularity of 1980s pop gave way to grunge, Yankovic decided it was time to record a parody of the Seattle-based band's huge hit single "Smells Like Teen Spirit". Yankovic later said, "I wanted to make sure that when I came back after that long hiatus, it was with something strong, and it wasn't until Nirvana that I felt I had a real contender." To secure permission for the parody, Yankovic wanted to approve it with Kurt Cobain. After learning that Nirvana was to perform on Saturday Night Live, Yankovic called up his UHF co-star, Victoria Jackson, who was, at the time, a regular cast member on the show. Jackson got Cobain on the phone so that Yankovic could make his request. Cobain agreed, although he asked if the new parody was "going to be a song about food". Yankovic reassured him that it would actually be about how "no one can understand [the] lyrics" to the original, which Cobain thought was funny. After receiving permission, Yankovic wrote and recorded "Smells Like Nirvana" on January 27, 1992.

After "Smells Like Nirvana", Yankovic recorded "Taco Grande", a Mexican food-themed parody of Gerardo's "Rico Suave". The latter features a cameo appearance from comedian Cheech Marin. Originally, Yankovic had wanted Marin to rap in Spanish, but it turned out that Marin knew only some basic Spanish. However, a bilingual secretary translated what Yankovic wanted him to say from English to Spanish and Marin read the resulting rap phonetically. One of the last songs to be recorded was the obligatory polka medley, "Polka Your Eyes Out". Yankovic had already performed the medley at Dr. Demento's 20th Anniversary Special on Comedy Central before the album had been released.

== Artwork ==
The cover for Off the Deep End parodies the famous cover of Nirvana's album Nevermind, which depicts an infant in the deep end of a pool chasing after a dollar bill on a fishhook. The Off the Deep End cover shows Yankovic in the baby's place apparently swimming to catch a doughnut on a string. While the Nirvana cover has a fully nude baby, Yankovic instead wore a bathing suit in a way that his body position hid it; he later jokingly noted, "I never really anticipated going full-frontal on any of my album covers." The CD, liner notes, and artwork continue the parody of Nirvana's album, borrowing the same blue, wave-light graphics from the printed surface of Nevermind.

== Reception ==
=== Critical reception ===
Professional ratings
Review scores
Source	Rating
AllMusic	4.5/5 stars
The Daily Vault	B−
Entertainment Weekly	C−
Pitchfork	6.7/10
Rolling Stone	3.5/5 stars

Critical response to Off the Deep End was generally positive. Many critics praised not only Yankovic's parodies, but also his originals. Barry Weber, of AllMusic, wrote, "In addition to re-establishing his satirical craftsmanship, Deep End showcases some of Yankovic's best originals ever; "Trigger Happy," "When I Was Your Age," and "You Don't Love Me Anymore" prove to be the album's greatest songs." Christopher Thelen, of the Daily Vault, wrote, "In fact, it's strange to admit, but the originals on Off The Deep End actually are, at times, stronger than the parodies." In The Rolling Stone Album Guide, Off the Deep End was awarded 3.5 stars out of 5, denoting that the album averaged between good and excellent. Not all reviews were so positive, however. Entertainment Weekly reviewer David Browne noted that the video for Off the Deep End' lead single "Smells Like Nirvana" was "an old-fashioned laugh riot", but that half of Yankovic's humor was merely visual, meaning that the songs without videos were not as funny.

The music video for "Smells Like Nirvana" achieved similar praise. Spy Magazine named it the "Video of the Year" in 1993, Rolling Stone ranked it as number 68 on their list of the Top 100 Videos of All Time, and it was nominated for the MTV Video Music Award for Best Male Performance in 1992.

At the 35th Annual Grammy Awards in 1993, Off the Deep End was nominated for the Best Comedy Album. However, the album lost to Peter Schickele's Music for an Awful Lot of Winds and Percussion.

=== Commercial performance ===
Off the Deep End was released April 1992, and was subsequently named the Best Selling Comedy Recording of the year by National Association of Recording Merchandisers (NARM). Off the Deep End was certified gold. On January 25, 2006, the album was certified platinum. The album's lead-off single, "Smells Like Nirvana" was a hit on the Billboard Hot 100, charting at number 35. It also charted on Hot 100 Singles Sales at number 12 and the US Billboard Mainstream Rock Tracks chart at number 35. Both the album and hit single helped propel Yankovic into the 1990s. As of 2014, sales in the United States have exceeded 1,057,000 copies, according to Nielsen SoundScan.

== Track listing ==
Original compact disc release
No.	Title	Writer(s)	Parody of	Length
1.	"Smells Like Nirvana"	Kurt Cobain, David Grohl, Krist Novoselic, Alfred Yankovic	"Smells Like Teen Spirit" by Nirvana	3:42
2.	"Trigger Happy"	Yankovic	Style parody of the Beach Boys and Jan & Dean	3:46
3.	"I Can't Watch This"	Stanley Burrell, James Johnson Jr., Alonzo Miller, Yankovic	"U Can't Touch This" by MC Hammer	3:31
4.	"Polka Your Eyes Out"	Various	A polka medley including: "Cradle of Love" by Billy Idol; "Tom's Diner" by Suzanne Vega; "Love Shack" by The B-52's; "Clarinet Polka" (Public domain); "Pump Up the Jam" by Technotronic; "Losing My Religion" by R.E.M.; "Unbelievable" by EMF; "Do Me!" by Bell Biv DeVoe; "Enter Sandman" by Metallica; "The Humpty Dance" by Digital Underground; "Cherry Pie" by Warrant; "Miss You Much" by Janet Jackson; "I Touch Myself" by Divinyls; "Dr. Feelgood" by Mötley Crüe; "Ice Ice Baby" by Vanilla Ice; "Ear Booker Polka" by "Weird Al" Yankovic	3:50
5.	"I Was Only Kidding"	Yankovic	Style parody of Tonio K	3:31
6.	"The White Stuff"	Larry Johnson, Yankovic	"You Got It (The Right Stuff)" by New Kids on the Block	2:43
7.	"When I Was Your Age"	Yankovic	Original	4:35
8.	"Taco Grande"	Christian Carlos Warren, Gerardo Mejia, Alberto Slezynger, and Rosa Soy, Yankovic	"Rico Suave" by Gerardo	3:44
9.	"Airline Amy"	Yankovic	Original composition inspired by the songs of Nick Lowe and Jonathan Richman	3:50
10.	"The Plumbing Song"	Frank Farian, B. Nail, Diane Warren, Yankovic	"Baby Don't Forget My Number" and "Blame It on the Rain" by Milli Vanilli	4:08
11.	"You Don't Love Me Anymore" (includes hidden track (Note: After 10 minutes of silence, the hidden track "Bite Me" is "six seconds of primal screaming". The hidden track (and silence) was removed from future pressings and digital versions.))	Yankovic	Style parody of Nicolette Larson	14:14
Total length:				41:18

== Personnel ==
Credits adapted from CD liner notes, except where noted.

Band members

- "Weird" Al Yankovic – lead and background vocals, keyboards, accordion
- Jim West – guitars, banjo, background vocals
- Steve Jay – bass guitar, background vocals
- Jon "Bermuda" Schwartz – drums, percussion

Additional musicians

- Brad Buxer – synthesizer
- Warren Luening – trumpet
- Joel Peskin – clarinet
- Tommy Johnson – tuba
- Julia Waters – background singer
- Maxine Waters – background singer
- Oren Waters – background singer (track 5)
- Luther Waters – background singer (track 5)
- Carmen Twillie – background singer
- Jim Haas – background singer (track 2)
- Jerry Whitman – background singer (track 2)
- Jon Joyce – background singer (track 2)
- Gene Morford – background singer (track 2)
- Peggy Newman – background singer (track 10)
- Natasha Neece – background singer (track 10)
- Alisa Curran – background singer (track 10)
- Samantha Kaye – background singer (track 10)
- Beau Weaver – voiceover announcer (track 3)
- Neil Ross – voiceover announcer (track 3)
- Marlene Aragon – voiceover announcer (track 3)
- Edith Fore – "I've fallen..." voiceover (track 3)
- Cheech Marin – Spanish spoken word vocal (track 8)

Technical

- "Weird Al" Yankovic – producer
- Tony Papa – engineer, mixing
- Jamey Dell – assistant engineer
- Colin Sauers – assistant engineer
- Kirk Weddle – photographs

== Charts and certifications ==
=== Charts ===
Chart (1992)	Peak position
Australian Albums Chart	45
Canadian RPM Albums Chart	24
US Billboard 200	17

=== Certifications ===
Country	Certification (sales thresholds)
United States	Platinum

=== Singles ===
Year	Song	Peak positions	
Year	Song	US	UK
1992	"Smells Like Nirvana"	35	58
