= Kim Scharnberg =

Kim Scharnberg is an American composer, arranger, orchestrator, record producer and conductor.

== Early life and education ==
He was raised in Cedar Rapids, Iowa, and was exposed to a large variety of different music while growing up. He started to play the trombone when he was 10 years old. Having studied arranging with Rayburn Wright and Manny Albam at the Eastman School of Music located in Rochester, New York, he went on to write several pieces performed by high level orchestras such as the Boston Pops and orchestrate many Broadway musicals, including being a co-producer for the grammy-nominated Jekyll and Hyde.
