= Tommy Johnson (tubist) =

American orchestral tuba player (1935–2006)

- Born: John Thomas Johnson; January 7, 1935; Los Angeles, California, U.S.
- Died: October 16, 2006 (aged 71); Los Angeles, California, U.S.
- Education: University of Southern California (B.M., 1956)
- Occupations: Musician, educator
- Spouse: Patricia Lehman (m. 1957)
- Children: 4
- Relatives: Stephen James Taylor (nephew)
- Musical career
- Genres: Classical; film score; rock and roll; jazz; pop
- Instrument: Tuba
- Years active: 1958–2006

John Thomas Johnson (January 7, 1935 - October 16, 2006) was an American orchestral tuba player. He performed on more than 2,000 film soundtracks, most notably John Williams' Jaws score, in which he played a high-register tuba solo as the melodic theme for the shark.

== Biography ==
=== Early life ===
He was born in Los Angeles, California to tailor Thomas Johnson and his wife Alma, the youngest of five siblings. Johnson had a musical upbringing as his father was a baritone soloist in the choir at the Angelus Temple in Echo Park.

He attended the University of Southern California Thornton School of Music, studying under Robert Marsteller. He received a bachelor's degree in music in 1956. He played on his first film in 1958, the score for Al Capone. He went on to become Hollywood's "first-call" tuba player, playing for television commercials and television series, such as The Flintstones. In addition to Jaws, his films included, The Godfather, the Indiana Jones series, the Star Trek film series, The Lion King, Titanic, The Thin Red Line (1998 remake), The Matrix, Cats & Dogs, Forrest Gump, Air Force One, Back to the Future, A Bug's Life and Lethal Weapon.

The Jaws solo was written in an extremely high range for the tuba. In a 2004 interview with Tubanews.com, Johnson remembered being late to the recording session and opened his music to find the tuba solo. It wasn't until later that he found out it was the theme for the shark. Johnson said he asked composer John Williams why he didn't write the solo for the French horn, an instrument better suited for the register. Williams' response was, "Well, I wanted something that was in that register but I wanted it to sound a little more threatening."

Upon Johnson's death, Williams praised him as "one of the great instrumentalists of his generation. Not only was he the voice of the shark in Jaws, his performance across the full range of the repertoire inspired not only me, but a whole generation of young tubists."

In addition to his work on film soundtracks, Johnson played on recording sessions for many albums by such artists as Elvis Presley and Frank Sinatra. "Weird Al" Yankovic said Johnson was his "go-to guy" whenever he needed a tubist for his polka medleys. Johnson performed the tuba solo on Yankovic's Nirvana parody, "Smells Like Nirvana". His other recordings include Clare Fischer's Extension, The Manhattan Transfer Meets Tubby the Tuba, Partita for Brass Quintet and Tape, and Jean-Pierre Rampal Plays Scott Joplin.

Johnson performed as tuba soloist with the Los Angeles Philharmonic Orchestra, the Pasadena Symphony, the San Fernando Valley Symphony, the L.A. Pops Orchestra, the Henry Mancini Orchestra, the Hollywood Bowl Orchestra, the Academy Awards Orchestra, the USC Wind Ensemble and the Los Angeles Tuba Quartet.

He taught junior high school music in the Los Angeles Unified School District for nearly 20 years, but for most of his career, he taught advanced tuba players in private lessons and at USC and UCLA. Among his students were Norm Pearson, principal tubist of the Los Angeles Philharmonic; Alan Baer, principal tubist of the New York Philharmonic; Gene Pokorny, principal tubist of the Chicago Symphony Orchestra; Wesley Jacobs, principal tubist (Ret.) of the Detroit Symphony Orchestra; John Van Houten; Jim Self, a jazz tubist and studio musician who worked on many sessions with Johnson; and Kent Fisk, principal tubist (Ret.) of the Adelaide Symphony Orchestra and West Australian Symphony Orchestra. Noted tubist Roger Bobo also studied under Marsteller in the 1950s, and he and Johnson became close friends and friendly competitors, playing many concerts and recording sessions together.

=== Personal life, memorial tribute ===
Johnson married Patricia Lehman (1938–2007), a Colorado-born violinist and a fellow music student from USC, in 1957. The couple had four children.

On October 16, 2006, Johnson died from complications of cancer and kidney failure at the UCLA Medical Center (now known as the Ronald Reagan UCLA Medical Center) in Los Angeles at the age of 71. He had been working until a few weeks before his death.

On December 3, 2006, a memorial concert was held at Bovard Auditorium at USC. The concert featured musical tributes by a variety of performers and culminated with the finale of Tchaikovsky's Symphony No. 4 in F Minor by a massed tuba choir of 99 tubists.

== Works ==
- The Addams Family
- Air Force One
- Al Capone
- Alien 3
- Analyze This
- Armageddon
- Austin Powers: The Spy Who Shagged Me
- Austin Powers in Goldmember
- The Babe
- Back to the Future, Part II and Part III
- Batman Forever
- Batman Returns
- Beethoven
- Beethoven's 2nd
- Beetlejuice
- The Bodyguard
- A Bug's Life
- Constantine
- Cars
- Cats & Dogs
- The Cat in the Hat
- Chain Reaction
- Chicken Little
- Close Encounters of the Third Kind
- Con Air
- Contact
- Crimson Tide
- Dances With Wolves
- Death Becomes Her
- Deep Rising
- Die Hard
- Die Hard 2
- Dracula
- The Edge
- Edward Scissorhands
- Enemy of the State
- Evolution
- Executive Decision
- Extreme Measures
- Father of the Bride Part II
- A Few Good Men
- First Wives Club
- Flags of Our Fathers
- The Flintstones
- The Flintstones in Viva Rock Vegas
- Flubber
- Forrest Gump
- Frequency
- The Frighteners
- The General's Daughter
- The Godfather, Part II and Part III
- Godzilla
- Grumpier Old Men
- The Haunting
- Honey
- Honeymoon in Vegas
- The Incredibles
- Independence Day
- Indiana Jones and the Last Crusade
- Instinct
- Jaws
- Jaws 2
- Jaws 3-D
- Jaws: The Revenge
- The Jungle Book
- The Karate Kid
- The Karate Kid Part II
- The Karate Kid Part III
- King Kong (1976)
- The Last of the Mohicans
- A League of Their Own
- Lethal Weapon
- Lethal Weapon 2
- Lethal Weapon 3
- Lethal Weapon 4
- Logan's Run
- The Lion King
- Mary Poppins
- The Matrix, The Matrix Reloaded and The Matrix Revolutions
- Maverick
- Men in Black
- Men in Black II
- Midway
- Monsters, Inc.
- MouseHunt
- Mr. Magoo
- Mulan
- The Muppet Musicians of Bremen
- Mystery, Alaska
- National Lampoon's Christmas Vacation
- The Natural
- The Nightmare Before Christmas
- The Nutty Professor
- The Odd Couple II
- The Parent Trap
- Planet of the Apes
- Pleasantville
- Pocahontas
- Police Academy
- Police Academy 2: Their First Assignment
- Police Academy 3: Back in Training
- Police Academy 4: Citizens on Patrol
- Police Academy 5: Assignment Miami Beach
- The Quick and the Dead
- The Rainmaker
- Reindeer Games
- Richie Rich
- Robin Hood
- Roots
- The Santa Clause
- Scream 2
- Scream 3
- Seven
- Silverado
- Small Soldiers
- Snow Day
- Space Jam
- Starship Troopers
- Star Trek: The Motion Picture
- Star Trek II: The Wrath of Khan
- Star Trek III: The Search for Spock
- Star Trek IV: The Voyage Home
- Star Trek V: The Final Frontier
- Star Trek VI: The Undiscovered Country
- Star Trek: Insurrection
- Star Trek: Nemesis
- Stuart Little
- Stuart Little 2
- Tarzan
- The Thin Red Line
- The Thomas Crown Affair
- The Tigger Movie
- The Towering Inferno
- Tin Cup
- Titanic
- Toy Story
- Toy Story 2
- True Lies
- Twister
- U-571
- Under Siege
- Under Siege 2: Dark Territory
- Unforgiven
- US Marshals
- Waiting to Exhale
- The Waterboy
- Waterworld
- Wild Wild West
- Wyatt Earp
