= UHF (film) =

1989 film by Jay Levey

- Theatrical release poster
- Directed by: Jay Levey
- Written by: "Weird Al" Yankovic; Jay Levey
- Produced by: Gene Kirkwood; John W. Hyde
- Starring: "Weird Al" Yankovic; Kevin McCarthy; Fran Drescher; Michael Richards; David Bowe; Victoria Jackson
- Cinematography: David Lewis
- Edited by: Dennis M. O'Connor
- Music by: John Du Prez
- Production company: Cinecorp
- Distributed by: Orion Pictures
- Release date: July 21, 1989
- Running time: 97 minutes
- Country: United States
- Language: English
- Budget: $5 million
- Box office: $6.1 million

UHF (released internationally as The Vidiot from UHF) is a 1989 American comedy film starring "Weird Al" Yankovic, David Bowe, Fran Drescher, Victoria Jackson, Kevin McCarthy, Michael Richards, Stanley Brock, Gedde Watanabe, Billy Barty, Anthony Geary, Emo Philips and Trinidad Silva in his final film role; as Silva died before filming wrapped, the film is dedicated to his memory. Directed by Jay Levey, Yankovic's manager, who also co-wrote the screenplay with him, the film was originally released by Orion Pictures. Yankovic and Levey struggled to find a production company to finance the film, but eventually secured Orion's support after agreeing to a $5 million budget. Principal photography took place around Tulsa, Oklahoma.

Yankovic stars as shiftless dreamer George Newman, who stumbles into managing a low-budget television station and surprisingly succeeds with his eclectic programming choices, spearheaded by the antics of a janitor-turned-children's television host, Stanley Spadowski (Richards). The competitive upstart provokes a major network station. The title refers to the ultra high frequency (UHF) analog television broadcasting band on which such low-budget television stations were often placed in the United States. Yankovic and Levey wrote the film following Yankovic's second album, "Weird Al" Yankovic in 3-D, and set parodies within George's vivid imagination.

Overshadowed by several concurrent major Hollywood blockbusters, UHF underperformed commercially and also received mixed critical reviews, which left Yankovic in a slump until the surprise success of his next album, Off the Deep End, in 1992. However, UHF soon became a cult film on home video and cable TV. The VHS version was rare and out of print for many years, with high prices online. In 2002, the DVD was released, and Shout! Factory released a special 25th-anniversary edition on November 11, 2014, on DVD and Blu-ray. On July 2, 2024, Shout! Factory released a 35th Anniversary Edition on 4K UHD, with a new 4K scan of the original 35mm camera negative and audio commentary with Weird Al and director Jay Levey.

== Plot ==
George Newman, a daydreaming slacker who bounces between jobs, is put in charge of Channel 62, a UHF television station, after his uncle, Harvey Bilchik, wins ownership of it in a poker game. George and his friend, Bob Steckler, realize the station is nearly bankrupt, subsisting on reruns of old shows like The Beverly Hillbillies and Mister Ed. When a package meant for its competitor, VHF station Channel 8, is mistakenly delivered to Channel 62, George decides to deliver it himself, only to be rudely dismissed by RJ Fletcher, owner and CEO of Channel 8. Outside, George meets a janitor, Stanley Spadowski (whom RJ had recently and unfairly fired after falsely accusing him of discarding a missing report), and hires him at Channel 62.

Bob and George create new programs, including the live children's show, Uncle Nutzy's Clubhouse (hosted by George), but all of them unfortunately fail to increase viewership. While fretting over their finances, George neglects his girlfriend, Teri's birthday dinner and she breaks up with him. The next day, during the Uncle Nutzy broadcast, a depressed George abandons the set, hands over hosting responsibilities to Stanley, and visits a bar with Bob to drown their sorrows, but discovers the patrons enjoying Stanley's slapstick antics on Channel 62. Inspired, the pair create various bizarre shows to fill the schedule, headlined by the re-titled Stanley Spadowski's Clubhouse.

Infuriated that Channel 62's ratings now rival those of Channel 8, including a majority of Top Five shows, RJ discovers Harvey owes his bookie, Big Louie, $75,000 by the end of the week, and offers to pay the debt in exchange for the deed to Channel 62. George launches a telethon to sell stock in the station, which would not only save it from RJ, but also make it publicly owned. RJ's henchmen stall the telethon by kidnapping Stanley, whom George and several staff members eventually rescue. RJ again attempts to stall the telethon with a televised public statement, but Channel 62 engineer Philo hijacks it with secretly recorded footage of RJ insulting the town's population to Teri's face during her visit to his Channel 8 headquarters.

The telethon ends about $2,000 short of its goal. Harvey concedes victory to RJ, who, instead of immediately taking ownership, gloats to the crowd. Meanwhile, a homeless man approaches George, asking to buy the remaining stock with money obtained by selling a rare 1955 doubled die cent that RJ, unaware of its true value, gave him when he was begging for change. George pays off Big Louie, Harvey signs the ownership transfer, and the station officially becomes publicly owned. Due to both its tardiness in filing its broadcast license renewal and the tirade that Philo broadcast, Channel 8 has its license revoked by the FCC, which subsequently shuts it down. After the Channel 62 staff and audience celebrate, George and Teri reconcile.

== Cast ==
- "Weird Al" Yankovic as George Newman, a daydreaming slacker who becomes the program director of Channel 62 at the behest of his aunt Esther.
- David Bowe as Bob Steckler/Bobbo the Clown, George's best friend and roommate.
- Fran Drescher as Pamela Finklestein, a secretary at Channel 62 who longs to be, and soon becomes, an on-air reporter.
- Michael Richards as Stanley Spadowski, the janitor at Channel 62 who also serves as the host of its highest-rated show.
- Kevin McCarthy as R.J. Fletcher, the owner of Channel 8 and the film's main antagonist.
- Victoria Jackson as Teri Campbell, George's long-suffering girlfriend.
- Stanley Brock as Harvey Bilchik, George's uncle and a serious gambler who wins Channel 62 in a poker game.
- Sue Ane Langdon as Aunt Esther Bilchik, Harvey's wife and George's aunt.
- Anthony Geary as Philo, Channel 62's station engineer who is secretly an alien.
- Billy Barty as Noodles MacIntosh, one of Channel 62's cameramen.
- Trinidad Silva as Raul Hernandez, host of a Channel 62 show about animals.
- Gedde Watanabe as Kuni, a karate teacher who later hosts a game show.
- Vance Colvig Jr. as a bum who eventually becomes the hero of the movie with his last-minute purchase of the last shares of Channel 62 stock.
- David Proval as Fletcher's head goon
- John Paragon as R.J. Fletcher III.
- Belinda Bauer as Mud Wrestler
- Dr. Demento as himself/Whipped Cream Eater
- Emo Philips as Joe Earley
- Patrick Thomas O'Brien as Satan
- The Kipper Kids as themselves
- John Cadenhead as Crazy Ernie

== Production ==
Yankovic and his manager, Jay Levey, had discussed the idea of a movie for Yankovic around 1985, after the success of his third album, Dare to Be Stupid; his popularity at that time led the two to thinking what other venues would work for the musician. The story concept they created was based on Yankovic's approach to his music video parodies. After sketching several such parodies for a film, they conceived Yankovic's character owning a small-time UHF station broadcasting these parodies as shows, as this would not require having any significant plot to string the parodies together, in a manner similar to Airplane! (1980).

The two shopped the script around Hollywood film agencies for about three years. They were surprised to learn one of their agents had shown the script to the founders of a new production company, Cinecorp, which was interested and had given it to producers Gene Kirkwood and John W. Hyde; Kirkwood stated he had previously seen Yankovic's videos and wanted to make a movie with him. Kirkwood and Hyde had connections with Orion Pictures, which offered up to $5 million (equivalent to $13.6 million in 2025).

The title refers to the ultra-high-frequency broadcast band, which, in the United States, was typically known for low-budget television stations with no network affiliation. Yankovic suggested the title, The Vidiot, for the international release. However, the studio chose The Vidiot from UHF to connect the international and American versions, with which Yankovic has expressed dissatisfaction.

=== Locations ===
Primary filming occurred in Tulsa between July 18 and September 21, 1988 (by coincidence, Tulsa itself has a channel 8, ABC affiliate KTUL-TV, though it had no involvement in the film). Executive producer Gray Frederickson had earlier finished shooting of The Outsiders in Oklahoma, and found the ease and cost of filming in the state appealing. They found several favorable factors that made the city suitable for filming. The Kensington Galleria (71st and Lewis) was being closed down to convert the mall into office space, allowing the production team to use it for both sound stage and interior scenes, including those for Channels 8 and 62. The mall was situated near a hotel for housing the cast and crew. The area and close proximity to Dallas allowed them to recruit additional local talent for some of the acts during the telethon scenes.

The Burger World location was Harden's Hamburgers at 6835 East 15th Street, and Bowling for Burgers was filmed at Rose Bowl Lanes on East 11th Street. The bar location was Joey's House of the Blues at 2222 East 61st Street. The building used for Kuni's Karate School belongs to Welltown Brewery and is located at 114 West Archer in Tulsa, and "Crazy Ernie's Used Car Emporium" was filmed on the lot of Ernie Miller Pontiac at 4700 South Memorial. The dead fish in Wheel of Fish were obtained from the White River Fish Market. The news desk was located at OETA, a local PBS member station. The steps of City Hall are actually First Christian Church at 913 S. Boulder, built in 1920. Channel 8's exterior is an office block (6655 South Lewis Building) occupied by Hewlett-Packard. The U-62 building was constructed around KGTO 1050's AM radio transmitter site (5400 West Edison Street); the real KGTO studios had been moved elsewhere in 1975. Just the tower remains at this location. The airport scenes were shot at Tulsa International Airport.

=== Casting ===
Yankovic was always envisioned to play the central character of the film, George Newman, written as a straight man with a vivid imagination as to allow the insertion of the parodies into the film's script in a manner similar to the film, The Secret Life of Walter Mitty (1947). To focus on the parodies, George was not developed beyond driving the principal storyline. The name "Newman" was selected as homage to Mad magazine's mascot, Alfred E. Neuman (the title of George's children's show, Uncle Nutsy's Clubhouse, also came from Mad).

Yankovic wrote the role of Stanley Spadowski with Michael Richards in mind, having been impressed with his stand-up comedy and performance on the show, Fridays. Stanley's role was influenced by Christopher Lloyd's performance on Taxi, so Yankovic had considered offering it to him, but kept Richards, due to their original premise. Richards' agents had told Yankovic that he was not interested in the role, due to a bout of Bell's palsy, but on second contact, Richards arrived on set and dropped right into the character for the test read.

Other principal roles were cast through normal auditions, with most of the choices based on how well the actor fit the role. For George's girlfriend, Teri Campbell, they did not significantly develop the relationship because they did not consider Yankovic a romantic lead. Jennifer Tilly and Ellen DeGeneres auditioned, and Victoria Jackson's soft demeanor was preferred.

For R.J. Fletcher, they found that Kevin McCarthy was in a similar stage of his career as Leslie Nielsen, one of many "serious vintage actors who had crossed over into satire", according to Levey, and McCarthy relished the role. Yankovic noted that McCarthy struggled not to laugh during takes. McCarthy later described his character as a fellow who "makes Ebenezer Scrooge look like Sally Struthers". Yankovic cited one of McCarthy's best-known roles as the ageless history teacher in the classic Twilight Zone episode, "Long Live Walter Jameson". Noting McCarthy's gray hair, Yankovic recalled a scene at the end, when Jameson aged rapidly, saying, "For just a split second, he looked just like [in UHF]."

Fran Drescher was cast as Pamela Finklestein, for her established comedy and for her nasally, New York-accented voice that made a humorous contrast for a news anchor. The producers considered Jerry Seinfeld for the role of George's friend Bob Speck, but he turned it down. David Bowe, a long-time Yankovic fan, easily fit the role during auditions. Philo's role was inspired by Joel Hodgson's stand-up routines with homemade inventions and deadpan comedy. Hodgson declined the role because he felt he was not a good actor and he was also working on Mystery Science Theater 3000. Crispin Glover was approached for the role, but only wanted to play a used car salesman. As the producers sought other actors, their casting agent, Cathy Henderson, suggested Anthony Geary, who had gained popularity on General Hospital. Geary wanted the role as a fan of Yankovic, and as completely opposite from his normal acting.

Kuni was conceived for Gedde Watanabe, while Yankovic created the role of the clumsy shop teacher for Emo Philips, a close friend of his. Ginger Baker of the rock band, Cream, volunteered to audition for the role of the hobo, but Yankovic and the production team found Vance Colvig, Jr. as a better fit. Levey appears as Mahatma Gandhi in the spoof segment, Gandhi II.

After Trinidad Silva performed his primary scenes, he was to return for the yet-unfilmed telethon scenes; however, he was killed by a drunken driver on July 31, 1988. The filmmakers were too grief-stricken to use body doubles and changed the telethon.

Sylvester Stallone had initially agreed to a cameo appearance in the final act, where Newman imagines himself as a John Rambo-type soldier on a mission to rescue Stanley Spadowski; however, Stallone ultimately declined.

== Reception ==
UHF received mixed reviews. On review aggregation website Rotten Tomatoes, the film has a 64% rating based on 25 reviews. The site's critical consensus reads, "UHF is bizarre, freewheeling, and spotty, though its anarchic spirit cannot be denied." On Metacritic, which assigns a weighted average based on selected critic reviews, the film has a score of 32 out of 100, based on 11 critics, indicating "generally unfavorable" reviews. Critic Roger Ebert wrote in the Chicago Sun-Times that Yankovic's approach to satire and parody works for the short-form music video, but does not work to fill out a full-length movie. Ebert also called to Yankovic's lack of screen presence, creating a "dispirited vacuum at the center of many scenes"; he gave UHF one star out of four. Chicago Tribune critic Gene Siskel wrote of the film, "Never has a comedy tried so hard and failed so often to be funny"; he gave it a zero star rating. Fellow Tribune critic Dave Kehr said of it "It's not surprising to find that UHF ultimately resolves itself into a series of four-minute, video-style sketches laid pretty much end-to-end, but at least Weird Al has given feature-length fiction the old college try, introducing rudimentary plot and number of semi-functional characters." Michael Wilmington of the Los Angeles Times believed that, as the entire film comprised parodies, it gave no structure for the larger plot to work, thus resulting in "not much of a movie".

According to Yankovic's Behind the Music episode, UHF had one of the most successful test screenings in Orion's history. Orion Pictures released UHF on July 21, 1989, hoping for a blockbuster that would revive their commercial fortunes. However, critical response was negative, and it was out of the theaters by the end of the month. The film has been compared to Young Einstein, which similarly scored well with test audiences, but failed to make a critical impression. Yankovic has stated that it was not a "critic movie", but was expected to "save the studio" for Orion. He was treated very well because of this, saying: "Every morning, I would wake up to fresh strawberries next to my bed. Then, when the movie bombed, I woke up and...no more strawberries!"

Since, the month prior to the release of UHF, studios released bigger movies like Indiana Jones and the Last Crusade, Ghostbusters II, Honey, I Shrunk the Kids, Lethal Weapon 2, Batman, Licence to Kill, Dead Poets Society, When Harry Met Sally..., Do the Right Thing, and Weekend at Bernie's, Yankovic has argued that the draw of these blockbusters depleted the attendance at UHF's premiere. The A.V. Club, in a retrospective, called UHF "a sapling among the redwoods" and the type of film that Hollywood has since abandoned. Yankovic and the film's other creators considered that the film had a strong audience with younger viewers, which did well to fill midday matinees, but did not succeed in helping to sell tickets for more lucrative evening and nighttime showings.

The poor critical response of UHF left Yankovic in a slump for three years, impacting the finalization of his next studio album. The slump was broken when the band, Nirvana, rose to wide popularity, inspiring him to write "Smells Like Nirvana" and complete the album, Off the Deep End.

=== Legacy ===
UHF has since become a cult classic, becoming popular on cable and home video. The movie was released on VHS in Europe, the United States and Canada, and also on LaserDisc in the United States, but because of the little money earned at the box office, it soon fell out of print. In the several years UHF was out of print, it developed a cult following. It was released on DVD in 2002 by MGM and, in its debut week, it became a top ten bestseller in Variety magazine. The US and Canadian DVD contains numerous extras, including a music video of the theme song, a commentary track featuring director Jay Levey and Yankovic (with surprise guest appearances by costars Michael Richards and Emo Philips and a phoned-in appearance by Victoria Jackson), and a deleted-scenes reel with Yankovic's commentary. Shout! Factory released a special 25th Anniversary Edition of UHF on November 11, 2014, on DVD and Blu-ray, and Fabulous Films released the movie on Blu-Ray in the United Kingdom on July 27, 2015.

Though Yankovic has considered the possibility of a sequel, he has not actively pursued this. He noted that UHF is "a product of its era, and comedy has changed so much over the decades", but also considered that the type of comedy predated the nature of Internet phenomena and viral videos. Yankovic further maintained the unlikelihood of a sequel to UHF in an interview, citing the underwhelming box office returns of the original, and lack of industry interest in financing another UHF project.

Gedde Watanabe later reprised his role as Kuni for a guest appearance on The Weird Al Show in 1997.

The music video for Yankovic's "Word Crimes" has the name George Newman on a test paper, and a Reddit account called u/George-Newman.

A webseries called The Real UHF, which was heavily inspired by UHF, started in 2009. It stars Dr. Demento, Neil Hamburger, and Count Smokula, and guest appearances including Devo and George Clinton.

A special screening of UHF at the Greek Theater in Los Angeles, including a live orchestra, occurred on October 31, 2026. While showing the film there had been a desire of Yankovic, he credited director Levey and composer Du Prez for pushing for its performance with a live band.

== Soundtrack ==
Yankovic released the soundtrack in late 1989, titled UHF – Original Motion Picture Soundtrack and Other Stuff, with songs and advertisements from the movie and new studio material.

== See also ==
- Weird: The Al Yankovic Story
- List of films featuring fictional films
