= Victoria Jackson =

American comedian (born 1959)

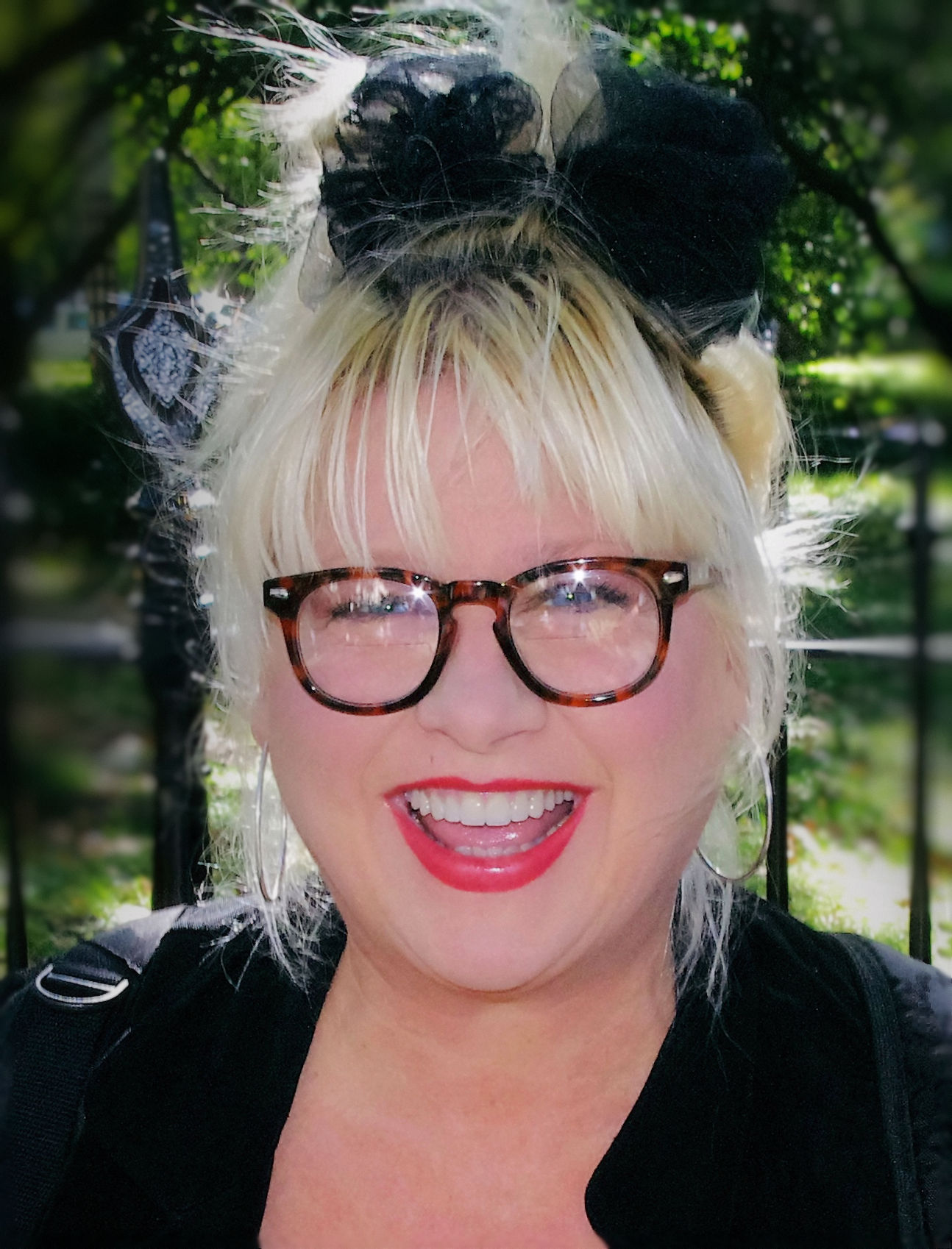
- Jackson in 2011
- Born: August 2, 1959 (age 67); Miami, Florida, U.S.
- Education: Palm Beach Atlantic University (BA)
- Occupations: Actress; comedian
- Years active: 1980–present
- Spouse: Paul Wessel
- Children: 2

Victoria Jackson (born August 2, 1959) is an American actress and comedian. She was a cast member on the series Saturday Night Live from 1986 to 1992.

== Early life and education ==
Jackson was born in Miami, Florida, the daughter of Marlene Esther (née Blackstad) and James McCaslin Jackson, a gym coach. From the age of 5 until she was 18, Jackson's father trained her in gymnastics.

After graduating from high school, Jackson attended Florida Bible College in Hollywood, Florida, later transferring to Furman University in Greenville, South Carolina on a gymnastics scholarship. At Furman, she was cast in her first play. She transferred to Auburn University in 1979 for her senior year, changing her major to theater. Midway through her senior year, she left Auburn to pursue an acting career.

In the 2000s, Jackson earned a degree in theater from Palm Beach Atlantic University.

== Acting and comedy ==
While doing summer stock theater in Alabama, Jackson met former child actor Johnny Crawford of the 1950s television series The Rifleman, who cast her in his nightclub act. She moved to Los Angeles in 1981, working various day jobs and performing comedy at night. Her first big break was an appearance on The Tonight Show Starring Johnny Carson, where she recited poetry while doing a handstand. She went on to appear on the show 20 times. In 1984 she appeared in the pilot for W*A*L*T*E*R, a M*A*S*H spin-off that the networks did not pick up.

Following a role in the short-lived 1985 television series Half Nelson, Jackson received an offer to audition for the cast of Saturday Night Live. Because she was not confident her audition had gone well, she performed several impersonations on her next Tonight Show appearance and sent the tape to SNL's Lorne Michaels. After viewing the tape, Michaels asked Jackson to join the show. A regular cast member from 1986 to 1992, Jackson often appeared on the show's weekly Weekend Update segment as a correspondent who goes off topic, reciting poetry and doing backbends or handstands on the desk. She was also known for recurring skit roles where she impersonated Roseanne Barr, Sally Struthers and Zsa Zsa Gabor.

During her tenure on SNL, Jackson was cast in a number of films, including Baby Boom, Family Business, I Love You to Death, UHF, The Pick-up Artist, The Couch Trip, and Casual Sex?.

Her film career continued after Jackson's 1992 departure from Saturday Night Live, but mostly in lower-budget films that earned little attention. Shortly after her departure from SNL Jackson was cast in a TV comedy co-starring George Clooney early in his career, and featuring Jackson as a Las Vegas showgirl. When there was a change in management at Fox, the show was scrapped without being broadcast. In 1994, she appeared as "Beverly" in the In the Heat of the Night episode "Good Cop, Bad Cop", and in 1999 she appeared as the unrequited love of a small-town man who can control the weather in The X-Files episode "The Rain King".

Jackson had a regular role as Patty in the 2000–2001 Comedy Central sitcom Strip Mall and in the 2003–2004 seasons of the Nickelodeon show Romeo!. In 2004 and 2005, she had roles in two romantic comedies, Shut Up and Kiss Me! and Her Minor Thing. During this period, Jackson appeared on the game show Hollywood Squares and participated in the show Celebrity Fit Club. She played multiple characters in the 2014 direct-to-video movie Campin' Buddies.

== Political views ==
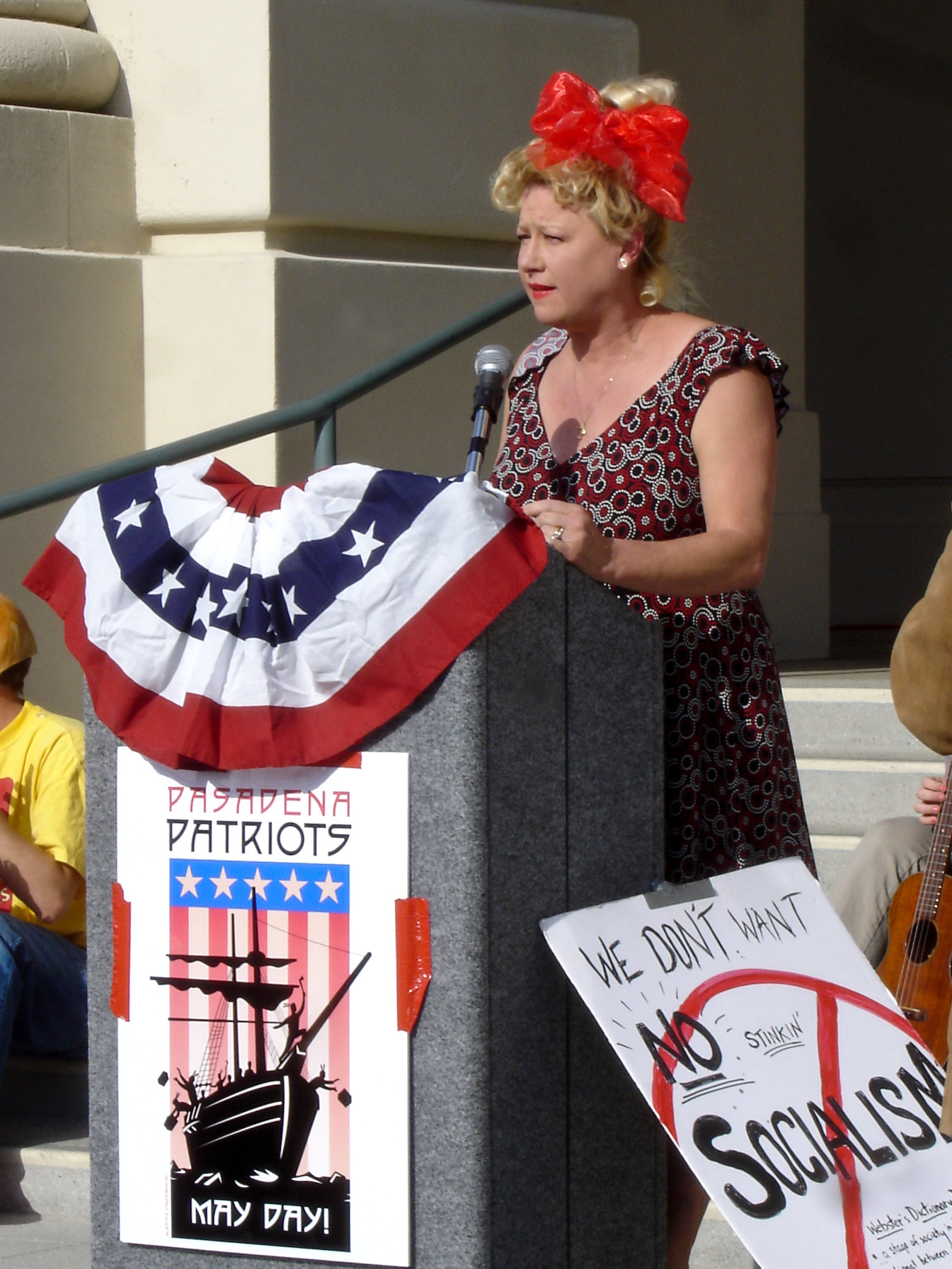
Jackson at a Tea Party rally in 2009

A self-described conservative Christian, Jackson has appeared in productions such as the 2007 Christian comedy concert Thou Shalt Laugh 2: The Deuce as well as a dozen times on Politically Incorrect with Bill Maher. She supported the Tea Party movement through appearances at events as well as her website, which was affiliated with the Liberty Alliance.

In October 2008, she appeared with other celebrities on The O'Reilly Factor in a National Republican Senatorial Committee advertisement poking fun at Al Franken, a fellow Saturday Night Live alumnus then running for the United States Senate from Minnesota.

Beginning in 2008, Jackson stated that she believed Barack Obama to be a communist. In 2015, she claimed that Obama was an "Islamic jihadist" and a member of the Muslim Brotherhood, with members of the organization in his cabinet, and that Obama's support for legal abortion and same-sex marriage showed he was not a Christian.

In 2011, Jackson criticized the TV show Glee for showing a kiss between two male actors, calling it "sickening" and citing the Bible to justify her criticism. When accused of homophobia, Jackson countered that the label was merely a "cute liberal buzzword" and suggested that Glee be replaced with a show promoting celibacy.

In 2011, Jackson joined the staff of Patriot Update as a writer and video blogger and host of the talk show Politichicks. Co-hosts included Ann-Marie Murrell, Jannique Stewart, and Jennie Jones. Jackson wrote a satirical song for "Politichicks" titled "Shariah Law", with the song's lyrics claiming, "They [Muslims] like beheadings and pedophile weddings". Among her work for Patriot Update was a piece on Occupy Wall Street that was critical of the protesters.

In 2012, White Hall publishers, part of the Liberty Alliance, released Jackson's autobiography Is My Bow Too Big? How I Went from Saturday Night Live to the Tea Party.

In 2012, after Todd Akin's remarks regarding pregnancies resulting from rape, Jackson said "If I got raped, I would have the baby. And if I didn't want to keep it because I had these horrible nightmares, I would adopt it out. But I think that God can turn a bad thing into a good thing, and that if I got raped and a beautiful baby who was innocent was born out of it, that would be a blessing."

In 2014, Jackson filed a petition as an independent candidate for one of two District 2 seats in Williamson County, Tennessee. She received 632 votes, not enough to secure either seat against the incumbent candidates.

In 2023, Jackson objected to Franklin, Tennessee, holding a gay pride parade.

== Personal life ==
Jackson married a fellow performer, fire-eating magician Nisan Mark Eventoff, in 1984, and had a daughter. They divorced in 1991. Shortly thereafter, she reconnected with her high school sweetheart, Paul Wessel, then a Miami-Dade SWAT team police officer, and they married and had a daughter. When her husband retired in 2013, the couple moved to Nashville, Tennessee. Jackson was diagnosed with breast cancer in 2015. She announced through an Instagram post in August 2024 that her breast cancer had metastasized and she had been diagnosed with an inoperable tumor in her windpipe.

== Filmography ==
- Double Exposure (1982)
- Bizarre (1985)
- Stoogemania (1986) as Nurse Grabatit
- Baby Boom (1987) as Eve
- The Pick-up Artist (1987) as Lulu
- Casual Sex? (1988) as Melissa
- The Couch Trip (1988) as Robin
- Dream a Little Dream (1989) as Kit
- UHF (1989) as Teri Campbell
- Family Business (1989) as Christine
- I Love You to Death (1990) as Lacey
- Sesame Street (1991) as Sid
- The Undercover Kid (1993) as Cat
- In the Heat of the Night (1994) as Beverly
- Unhappily Ever After (1995) as Susan
- The Weird Al Show (1997) as Herself
- Nightmare Ned (1997) as Sarah Needlemeyer (voice)
- No More Baths (1998) as Charlotte
- Touched by an Angel (1998) as Waitress
- The X-Files (1999) as Shelia Fontaine
- Sabrina the Teenage Witch (2000) as Annabelle Saberhagen
- The Wheels on the Bus (2000s) as Moon Mouse
- Strip Mall (2000–2001) as Patti
- Romeo! (2003–2004) as Marie Rogers
- Shut Up and Kiss Me (2004) as Harriet Ballister
- Kamen Rider: Dragon Knight (2008-2009) as Grace Kiefer
- Brother White (2012) as Victoria
- Fat Chance (2015) as Nancy
- The Matchbreaker (2016) as Mrs. Taylor
- Altar Egos (2017) as Barbara
- Heaven Bound (2017) as Miss Thompson
- Jingle Smells (2023) as Enchantress Kale
- Boardwalk Winter (2025) as Mrs. Kellogg

== Books ==
- Is My Bow Too Big? How I Went from Saturday Night Live to the Tea Party, 2012, ISBN 978-1-4675-0256-6
- Lavender Hair: 21 Devotions for Women with Breast Cancer, 2017, ISBN 978-1-4245-5562-8
- Not Dead Yet: A Lifetime of Handstands, Art and Poetry, 2026, ISBN 9789693093773

== See also ==
- List of people from Miami
