= You Don't Love Me Anymore ("Weird Al" Yankovic song) =

1992 single by "Weird Al" Yankovic

Single by "Weird Al" Yankovic

from the album Off the Deep End
- B-side: "I Was Only Kidding"
- Released: June 19, 1992
- Recorded: June 7, 1990
- Genre: Acoustic; soft rock; comedy
- Length: 4:00 (album version); 14:07 (with "Bite Me")
- Label: Scotti Brothers
- Songwriter: "Weird Al" Yankovic
- Producer: "Weird Al" Yankovic

"Weird Al" Yankovic singles chronology
"Smells Like Nirvana" (1992)	"You Don't Love Me Anymore" (1992)	"Taco Grande" (1992)

Music video
- "You Don't Love Me Anymore" on YouTube

"You Don't Love Me Anymore" is a song by American recording artist "Weird Al" Yankovic. It was released as the second single from his seventh studio album Off the Deep End on June 19, 1992. While much of his musical output consists of parodies of other artists' material, "You Don't Love Me Anymore" is an original composition written and produced by Yankovic. The song is a soft acoustic ballad that features darkly humorous lyrics about a relationship between Yankovic and an unnamed woman that has faltered to the point that she repeatedly attempts to kill him, which he has only just begun to notice; this is Yankovic's first ballad.

Yankovic requested his record label Scotti Brothers to release the song as the second single from Off the Deep End. As the label would only release the single if its music video was a parody, Yankovic modeled the video for "You Don't Love Me Anymore" after the video for the song "More Than Words" by American rock band Extreme. Directed by Jay Levey, the video features a cameo appearance by American-Canadian singer Robert Goulet. To Yankovic's surprise, "You Don't Love Me Anymore" garnered moderate amounts of radio airplay and peaked at number 26 on the Canadian singles chart.

The song was covered in German by heavy metal band JBO as "Ich glaube, Du liebst mich nicht mehr" and in Dutch by WC Experience as "Jij wekt de impressie".

== Release ==
Following the success of Off the Deep End's lead single "Smells Like Nirvana", Yankovic desired to release "You Don't Love Me Anymore" as the album's second single. Yankovic's record label Scotti Brothers reluctantly adhered to the request, on the condition that the song's music video be a parody. Released on June 19, 1992, the single received moderate amounts of radio airplay and peaked at number 26 on the singles chart of Canadian magazine The Record. Its airplay levels surprised Yankovic, who had observed that radio stations "usually just go for the parodies." "You Don't Love Me Anymore" was also issued as a 12-inch single in the Philippines by Mobile Disco Records – the release featured a dance music remix of the song, the only authorized extended mix of a Yankovic track not to be issued by his label.

== Music video ==
The music video for "You Don't Love Me Anymore" was directed by Yankovic's long-time collaborator and manager Jay Levey. Filmed at the Charlie Chaplin Studios in Los Angeles, it is a parody of the music video for "More Than Words" by American rock band Extreme and a follow-up on the video of "Smells Like Nirvana". Yankovic's record label Scotti Brothers had informed him that "You Don't Love Me Anymore" – an original composition – would be released as a single under the condition that an accompanying parody music video be produced. As many had erroneously believed the song was a parody of "More Than Words" upon release, he decided to spoof its video.

The "You Don't Love Me Anymore" video features Yankovic and his guitarist Jim West performing the song, with the latter basing his appearance on Extreme guitarist Nuno Bettencourt. Bassist Steve Jay is also seen biting into a large piece of ham; he chipped his tooth while filming the scene and is seen wincing in pain as he does this in the video. One notable gag involves Yankovic picking up another guitar, only to put it away without actually playing it, instead beginning to sing the second verse. American singer and actor Robert Goulet makes a cameo appearance as a piano player who suffers various bodily injuries. Tony De La Rosa (who portrayed the janitor in the "Smells Like Teen Spirit" and "Smells Like Nirvana" videos) takes on the role of a cellist in janitor garb who accidentally flings his bow into Goulet's eye. Towards the end of the video, Yankovic smashes West's Ovation guitar. He later recounted: "Most of the guitars I had broken at that point were cheap guitars, and this one did not smash, but I knew I had one take, so you'll see me whack the thing like 20 times, like, 'You’ve gotta break! This is the only take! I’m gonna smash this thing if it takes me all day!'"

== Formats and track listings ==
- Cassette single (Canada and United States)
1. "You Don't Love Me Anymore" – 4:00
2. "I Was Only Kidding" – 3:31
- 12-inch single (Philippines)
1. "You Don't Love Me Anymore" – 4:00
2. "You Don't Love Me Anymore" (dance mix) – 5:00

== Charts ==
Chart (1992)	Peak position
Canadian Singles Chart (The Record)	26

== Personnel ==
Credits adapted from Off the Deep End liner notes.

- "Weird Al" Yankovic – vocals, keyboards, production, songwriting
- Jim West – acoustic guitar
- Tony Papa – engineering, mixing
- Brad Buxer – synthesizers
