= UHF – Original Motion Picture Soundtrack and Other Stuff =

1989 studio album by "Weird Al" Yankovic

Studio album / soundtrack album by "Weird Al" Yankovic
- Released: July 18, 1989
- Recorded: December 20, 1988 – May 25, 1989
- Studios: Santa Monica Sound Recorders, Santa Monica
- Genres: Comedy; parody
- Length: 42:28
- Labels: Rock 'n Roll; Scotti Brothers
- Producer: Rick Derringer

"Weird Al" Yankovic chronology
"Weird Al" Yankovic's Greatest Hits (1988)	UHF – Original Motion Picture Soundtrack and Other Stuff (1989)	Off the Deep End (1992)

Singles from UHF – Original Motion Picture Soundtrack and Other Stuff
- 1. "UHF" Released: July 1989; 2. "Money for Nothing/Beverly Hillbillies" Released: August 8, 1989

UHF – Original Motion Picture Soundtrack and Other Stuff is the sixth studio album and soundtrack album by the American parody musician "Weird Al" Yankovic, released on July 18, 1989. The album is the final of Yankovic's to be produced by former McCoys guitarist Rick Derringer. Recorded between December 1988 and May 1989, the album served as the official soundtrack to the 1989 film of the same name, although the original score by John Du Prez is omitted. The album's lead single was the titular "UHF", although it was not a hit and did not chart.

The music on UHF is built around pastiches of rock, rap, and pop music of the late 1980s, featuring parodies of songs by Dire Straits, Tone Lōc, Fine Young Cannibals, and R.E.M. The album also features many "style parodies", or musical imitations of existing artists. These style parodies include imitations of specific artists like Harry Chapin, as well as various musical genres like blues. The album also features many music cuts from the film as well as some of the commercials, like "Spatula City", and other parody bits, like "Gandhi II".

Peaking at No. 146 on the Billboard 200, the album was not a commercial success, and received lukewarm critical attention. The UHF soundtrack is one of Yankovic's few studio albums not certified either Gold or Platinum by the Recording Industry Association of America (RIAA) in the United States. It would also be Yankovic's last studio album to be released on vinyl record in the U.S. until 2011's Alpocalypse.

== Production ==
=== Background and recording ===
Following the success of Yankovic's 1988 album Even Worse, which featured the Michael Jackson spoof "Fat", Yankovic pitched a screenplay co-written by his manager Jay Levey called UHF (internationally known as The Vidiot from UHF) to Orion Pictures. A satire of the television and film industries, the film starred Yankovic as George Newman, a man who stumbles into managing a low-budget UHF television station and finds success with his eclectic programming choices. Also starring Michael Richards, Fran Drescher, and Victoria Jackson, it brought the floundering studio Orion their highest test scores since the movie RoboCop. Although the movie made slightly over US$6 million domestically—out of a budget of $5 million—it was considered unsuccessful.

In December 1988, Yankovic returned to the studio to record the soundtrack to his feature film. Once again, former McCoys guitarist Rick Derringer was brought in to produce the album. This would be Derringer's last production credit for Yankovic. The producer and musician eventually parted ways because Derringer found that Yankovic would not listen to his input, and Yankovic came to realize that he could do most of the production work himself. Subsequent studio albums would be produced by Yankovic. Recording with Yankovic were Jon "Bermuda" Schwartz on drums, Steve Jay on bass, and Jim West on guitar. The album was recorded in six different sessions at both Santa Monica Sound Records in Santa Monica, California and Westlake Recording Studios in Los Angeles. During the first session, the song "Money for Nothing/Beverly Hillbillies" was recorded. The second session yielded the titular "UHF" and "Let Me Be Your Hog". During the third session, Yankovic recorded "Stanley Spadowski's Theme"—which would later be renamed "Fun Zone"—as well as the skit "Gandhi II". Only one song was recorded during the fourth sessions, the skit "Spatula City". The fifth recording session resulted in five songs: "Spam", "Attack of the Radioactive Hamsters From a Planet Near Mars", "Hot Rocks Polka", "Biggest Ball of Twine in Minnesota", and "Generic Blues". The sixth and final session produced the two parodies "Isle Thing" and "She Drives Like Crazy".

=== Originals ===
On February 24, 1989, Yankovic recorded the first original song for the album, "Let Me Be Your Hog". The song is a short rock snippet that is heard in the movie as Newman's uncle Harvey (Stanley Brock) lounges in his pool. Originally, Yankovic had wanted to use the 1974 single "Kung Fu Fighting" by Carl Douglas for the scene, but he could not obtain the rights for the song, and thus "Let Me Be Your Hog" was recorded. Yankovic then recorded the theme from his movie, the titular "UHF", written in the style of a TV station's large promotional campaign. On February 25, Yankovic recorded the instrumental "Fun Zone", also known as "Stanley Spadowski's Theme". Originally written four years earlier for a failed Saturday Night Live replacement titled Welcome to the Fun Zone, this song is played at the beginning of every Weird Al concert.

Three months later, on May 24, 1989, Yankovic recorded three more originals. The first of these, "Attack of the Radioactive Hamsters from a Planet Near Mars", is a rock song about a number of mutated hamsters terrorizing Earth. The second original song, "The Biggest Ball of Twine in Minnesota", is a folk ballad about a family road trip to a tourist location in Minnesota. Musically, the song was inspired both by the book Roadside America, which "featured all the campy places around the country that one could possibly visit", as well as the music of Harry Chapin and Gordon Lightfoot, which Yankovic described as "storyteller songs, [with] sprawling narratives". The final original song recorded for the album was "Generic Blues", Yankovic's attempt to write "the ultimate blues song". After the release of the song, B.B. King listed it as one of his top ten favorite blues songs.

UHF – Original Motion Picture Soundtrack and Other Stuff is also notable in that it was Yankovic's first and only studio album to dabble in the art of skits. The first of these segments is called "Gandhi II", which re-imagines Mahatma Gandhi as the hero of a blaxploitation-style sequel to the film Gandhi, spoofing both the theme and promos for the film Shaft. The second skit is called "Spatula City" and is an advertisement for a spatula outlet store. These short segments were used in the film as commercials; other commercial segments, such as "Plots 'R Us" and "Conan the Librarian", were not used on the album.

=== Parodies and polka ===
"Money for Nothing/Beverly Hillbillies" (sample)
"Money for Nothing/Beverly Hillbillies", from Yankovic's soundtrack to his 1989 film UHF titled UHF – Original Motion Picture Soundtrack and Other Stuff. The parody is the lyrics of The Beverly Hillbillies theme music set to the tune of the Dire Straits song "Money for Nothing".

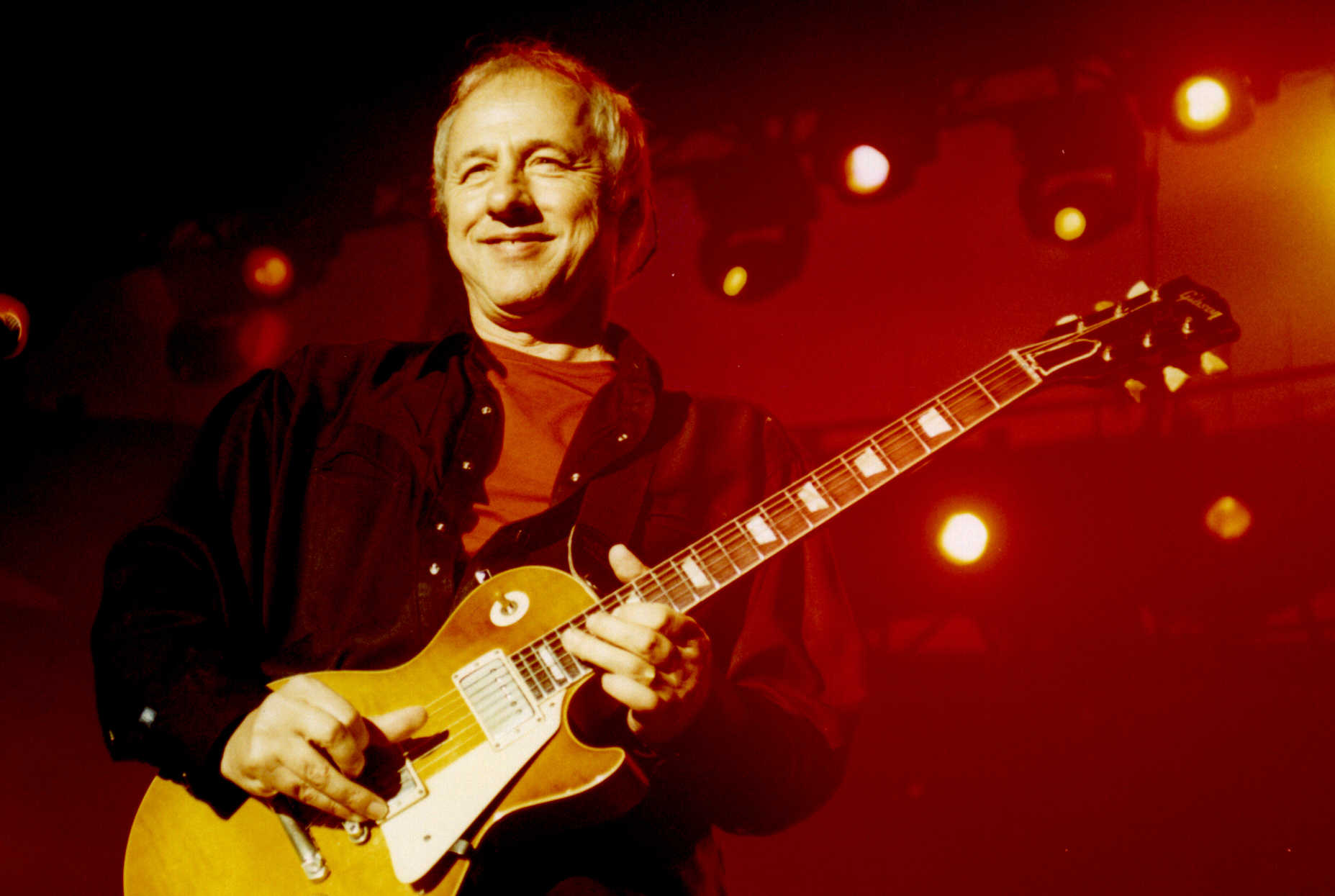
Dire Straits' guitarist Mark Knopfler specifically asked to play guitar on Yankovic's parody.

On December 20, 1988, Yankovic recorded "Money for Nothing/Beverly Hillbillies". The song features the lyrics of The Beverly Hillbillies theme song altered slightly and set to the tune of "Money for Nothing". The song appears in its entirety within UHF as a computer-animated dream sequence, framed as if it were part of a music video. As part of his terms that allowed Yankovic to record this parody, Dire Straits lead singer and guitarist and "Money for Nothing" songwriter Mark Knopfler insisted that he be allowed to play the guitar featured in the parody. As a result, both he and Guy Fletcher—Dire Straits' keyboardist—recorded their parts on guitar and synthesizer respectively. According to Yankovic, his guitarist Jim West had practiced the song for weeks, and, as a result could recreate the original; Knopfler, on the other hand, had been playing the song for years and was much more relaxed with his playing. As a result, West's version sounded more like the original version, although Knopfler's track was the one used. Yankovic revealed in the DVD commentary for UHF that the concept "Money for Nothing/Beverly Hillbillies" was originally a parody of Prince's 1984 hit "Let's Go Crazy". Prince, however, refused, and was unreceptive to any parody ideas Yankovic ever presented him with. The fractured titled "Money for Nothing/Beverly Hillbillies" is a result of Dire Straits' lawyers insisting that "Money for Nothing" remain in the parody's title. Yankovic was unhappy with the title and stated that he would rather have had the title be either "Money for Nothing for the Beverly Hillbillies" or "Beverly Hillbillies for Nothing". The legal title for the song features an asterisk after the word "Hillbillies", although it is often printed without the marking. (Note: Because this is only the song's legal title, and because it is not written that way on the album itself, it will not be used in this article.)

On May 24, 1989, Yankovic started recording the second parody for the album, "Spam". The song, a play on R.E.M.'s hit "Stand", is an ode to the canned luncheon meat Spam. Yankovic noted that it was "fun to pick [apart the song] and figure out some of those almost subliminal parts—parts that would fade in and out, little bell sounds, things you don't really hear on first listening." On May 25, 1989, Yankovic recorded "Isle Thing", a parody of "Wild Thing" by Tone Lōc, about a woman who introduces the narrator to the television show Gilligan's Island. Notably, the song is Yankovic's first rap parody; an earlier rap, "Twister", is a Beastie Boys style spoof, but not a direct parody. Another Tone Lōc hit, "Funky Cold Medina", is referenced in the lyrics: "Ginger and Mary Ann coulda used some funky cold medina". The final parody, "She Drives Like Crazy"—recorded the same day as "Isle Thing"—is a spoof of Fine Young Cannibals' 1988 single "She Drives Me Crazy". Lyrically, the song is about a man who fears his girlfriend's crazy driving habits.

Like many of Yankovic's previous albums, UHF – Original Motion Picture Soundtrack and Other Stuff features a polka medley of hit songs. "The Hot Rocks Polka" contains songs written and made popular by the Rolling Stones.

=== Music videos ===
External videos
- "Money for Nothing/Beverly Hillbillies" music video
- "UHF" music video

Both "Money for Nothing/Beverly Hillbillies" and "UHF" received stand-alone music videos. The "Money for Nothing/Beverly Hillbillies" video was reused for the movie, described above. The "UHF" video featured Yankovic and his band parodying other musicians and specific music videos, interspersed with clips from the movie. Artists and videos parodied included Guns N' Roses' "Welcome to the Jungle", ZZ Top's "Legs", the Beatles' "Your Mother Should Know", George Michael's "Faith", Robert Palmer's "Addicted to Love", Prince's "When Doves Cry" and "1999", Talking Heads' "Once in a Lifetime" and "Girlfriend Is Better", Peter Gabriel's "Sledgehammer", Billy Idol's "White Wedding" and "Rebel Yell", INXS's "Mediate", and Randy Newman's "I Love L.A.".

== Reception ==
=== Critical response ===
Professional ratings
Review scores
Source	Rating
AllMusic	3/5 stars
Pitchfork	4.7/10
The Rolling Stone Album Guide	3/5 stars

Due to the short stint of UHF in theaters, its soundtrack got "lost in the shuffle" and did not receive much of a critical response. However, from the few reviews it did receive, the album received a mixed response. Jacob Lunders of AllMusic called it a "guilty pleasure". Lunders noted that the album "endures artistically as a transitional album between his '80s heyday and the imminent artistic makeover revealed on 1992's Off the Deep End". He ultimately concluded that the album is something that only "moderate [to] genuine" fans may want, but that it is "nearly as accessible" as many of his compilation albums. The Rolling Stone Album Guide awarded the album three stars out of five, denoting a "good" album. A TV Guide critic, in a review of the movie, wrote that "the quality of [the movie's] parodies" are "inconsistent, with the movie and music takeoffs being obvious and out of date."

=== Commercial performance ===
UHF – Original Motion Picture Soundtrack and Other Stuff was released July 18, 1989. After it was released, the album peaked at number 146 on the Billboard 200. Much like Polka Party! (1986), the album was considered a major commercial disappointment for the comedian; the album is his second-lowest charting album after Polka Party!. The UHF soundtrack is one of only a few of Yankovic's studio albums that is not certified either Gold or Platinum by the Recording Industry Association of America (RIAA) in the United States. The others include Polka Party! and Poodle Hat (2003). UHF was Yankovic's last studio album to be released in the US on vinyl record until 2011's Alpocalypse.

== Track listing ==
Side one
No.	Title	Writer(s)	Parody of	Length
1.	"Money for Nothing/Beverly Hillbillies"	Mark Knopfler, Gordon Sumner, Paul Henning, Alfred Yankovic	"Money for Nothing" by Dire Straits with lyrics of "The Ballad of Jed Clampett" by Flatt & Scruggs	3:11
2.	"Gandhi II"	Yankovic	Skit	1:00
3.	"Attack of the Radioactive Hamsters from a Planet Near Mars"	Yankovic	Original	3:28
4.	"Isle Thing"	Matthew Dike, Michael Ross, Yankovic	"Wild Thing" by Tone Lōc	3:37
5.	"The Hot Rocks Polka"	Various	A polka medley of Rolling Stones songs: "It's Only Rock 'n Roll (But I Like It)"; "Brown Sugar"; "You Can't Always Get What You Want"; "Honky Tonk Women"; "Under My Thumb"; "Ruby Tuesday"; "Miss You"; "Sympathy for the Devil"; "Get Off of My Cloud"; "Shattered"; "Let's Spend the Night Together"; "(I Can't Get No) Satisfaction"; "Ear Booker Polka" by "Weird Al" Yankovic	4:50
6.	"UHF"	Yankovic	Original	5:09

Side two
No.	Title	Writer(s)	Parody of	Length
7.	"Let Me Be Your Hog"	Yankovic	Original	0:16
8.	"She Drives Like Crazy"	Roland Gift, David Steele, Yankovic	"She Drives Me Crazy" by Fine Young Cannibals	3:42
9.	"Generic Blues"	Yankovic	Style parody of the blues	4:34
10.	"Spatula City"	Yankovic	Skit	1:07
11.	"Fun Zone"	Yankovic	Instrumental	1:45
12.	"Spam"	William Berry, Peter Buck, Michael Mills, John Stipe, Yankovic	"Stand" by R.E.M.	3:12
13.	"The Biggest Ball of Twine in Minnesota"	Yankovic	Style parody of Harry Chapin and Gordon Lightfoot	6:50
Total length:				42:28

== Personnel ==
Credits adapted from LP liner notes.

Band members

- "Weird Al" Yankovic – lead and background vocals, keyboards, accordion
- Jim West – guitars, banjo, background vocals
- Steve Jay – bass guitar, background vocals
- Jon "Bermuda" Schwartz – drums, percussion

Additional musicians

- Kim Bullard – synthesizers
- Rick Derringer – guitar, background vocals
- The Waters Sisters – background vocals
- The Step Sisters – vocals (track 10)
- Jimmy Z. – harmonica
- Warren Luening – trumpet
- Donny Sierer – saxophone
- M.G. Kelly – "Spatula City" announcer
- Jim Rose – "Gandhi II" announcer
- Mark Knopfler – guitar (track 1)
- Guy Fletcher – synthesizer (track 1)

Technical

- Rick Derringer – producer
- "Weird Al" Yankovic – arranger
- Tony Papa – engineer
- Daryll Dobson – engineer
- Jamey Dell – assistant engineer
- Bill Malina – assistant engineer
