= Street Fighter (2026 soundtrack) =

2026 film soundtrack album

Street Fighter (Original Motion Picture Soundtrack)

Soundtrack album by Leo Birenberg and Zach Robinson
- Released: October 16, 2026
- Studios: British Grove Studios, London; Decca Studios, London; Rottenbiller Studios, Budapest; Seahorse Sound Studios, Los Angeles
- Genres: Film score; heavy metal; industrial rock; Indian classical music; electronic dance music
- Length: 88:33
- Labels: Milan; Paramount
- Producers: Leo Birenberg; Zach Robinson

Leo Birenberg and Zach Robinson chronology
Super Troopers 3 (2026)	Street Fighter (2026)

Street Fighter (Original Motion Picture Soundtrack) is the soundtrack album to the 2026 film Street Fighter directed by Kitao Sakurai which is based on the Street Fighter video game series by Capcom. The album features original score composed by Leo Birenberg and Zach Robinson and two original songs by the industrial rock band Health. The album was released through Milan Records and Paramount Music on October 16, 2026.

== Background ==
Leo Birenberg and Zach Robinson composed the score for Street Fighter renewing his association with Sakurai after their collaboration in Twisted Metal. The composers admitted that the music for the video game has been their core musical foundation that shaped their career as composers, having listened to "Guile's Theme" composed by Yoko Shimomura for the video game. The newer version of "Guile's Theme" served as a nod to the original theme, and had attempted the reinterpretation to be heavily substantial for the film.

The composers added that the primary goal for them was to present each character with a unique musical identity, and they went ahead with a fan-pleasing approach by creating distinct sounds for the characters and had incorporated most of them for nostalgic moments. He also admitted the action choreography for E. Honda was the most unique segments to score for and praised the director for allowing unconventional experimentations with the music. The duo also expressed on incorporating the music of 50 Cent to create a seamless "dovetail" between the licensed pre-existing music and original compositions.

In addition to the score, the industrial rock band Health contributed two original songs—"Negative Edge" and "Brainrot". Guitarist Charlie Robbins also worked on few of the musical pieces as one of the featured soloists.

== Release ==
The new adaptation of "Guile's Theme" was released as a single on September 30, 2026. The soundtrack album featuring the songs and score was released through Milan Records and Paramount Music on October 16, 2026.

== Reception ==
Zanobard Reviews assigned the score 7.5/10 saying, "The sheer enthusiasm of Leo Birenberg and Zach Robinson's bombastically electric guitar-led score for Street Fighter is a thing to behold by itself, so that combined with a killer '90s-styled orchestral/electronic sound and countless references to iconic themes makes it so worth a listen." Ayaan Paul Chowdhury of The Hindu added that "few composers are better equipped to soundtrack men punching through their feelings than Leo Birenberg and Zach Robinson of Cobra Kai fame". Kristy Puchko of Mashable India wrote "The score by composers Leo Birenberg and Zach Robinson leans on electric guitar and synth keyboards that throw back to '90s action-movie sensibilities." Dan Bayer of Next Best Picture called it "a kinetic techno score by Leo Birenberg and Zach Robinson".

== Track listing ==
No.	Title	Artist(s)	Length
1.	"Fight!"		2:44
2.	"Negative Edge"	Health	3:29
3.	"Chun-Li: Woman of Vengeance"	Leo Birenberg; Zach Robinson; Jiaju Shen	1:01
4.	"The Greatest Fighters in History"		3:03
5.	"M. Bison"		0:58
6.	"Combat News"		2:15
7.	"World Warriors"	Birenberg; Robinson; Charlie Robbins	2:42
8.	"Ryu: Lost Champion"		2:25
9.	"Guile's Theme"	Birenberg; Robinson; Jemma Heigis; Myrone; Jacob Umansky	2:46
10.	"Brainrot"	Health	2:38
11.	"Metrolao Hotel"		0:45
12.	"Gouken's Fate"		2:40
13.	"Haircut"		2:27
14.	"Honda's Wager"		1:27
15.	"Interpol"		3:35
16.	"Red Cyclone"		1:16
17.	"Thigh Fidelity"		1:42
18.	"The Branding"		3:01
19.	"Sacred Hado"		2:30
20.	"Good Friend, Ken"		0:53
21.	"1993 World Warrior Showdown"		0:56
22.	"Ken vs Balrog: Give the People What They Want"		1:44
23.	"Blanka Brawl"		3:57
24.	"Guile's Guile"		0:43
25.	"Let Go of What Binds You"		2:52
26.	"A More Important Calling"		1:46
27.	"Jailbreak"		1:36
28.	"Beauty, Spoiled"		1:38
29.	"It's Tuesday"		1:34
30.	"Vanilla Gumdrop"		0:48
31.	"Running from What's Inside"		1:15
32.	"I Made a Promise"		2:06
33.	"Ken vs Ryu"		2:42
34.	"Akuma's Arrival"		1:47
35.	"The Final Awakening"	Birenberg; Robinson; Charlie Robbins	3:06
36.	"Hadoken!"		2:48
37.	"To Live Is to Fight"		1:38
38.	"The Fight Continues!"	Birenberg; Robinson; Charlie Robbins	4:59
39.	"Let Go of What Binds You" (Dhalsim's Cave Rave Remix)		6:21
Total length:			88:33

== Personnel ==
Credits adapted from Film Music Reporter:

- Music composers and producers: Leo Birenberg, Zach Robinson
- Additional music producer: Luke Silas
- Music supervisors: Peter Afterman, Alison Litton
- Music coordinator: Jane Berry
- Score coordinators: Santiago Amezquita, Dan Light, Ramiro Rodriguez Zamarripa
- Digital recordist: John Prestage
- Recording studio: Seahorse Sound Studios
- Recording engineers: Casey Stone, Chris Kasych
- Assistant recording engineers: Dave Reichhardt
- Mixing engineer: Phil McGowan
- Score editor: Andres Locsey
- Music legal services: Christine Bergren
- Music preparation: Fine Line Music Services, Charts of London, Norbert Elek
- Heads of music preparation: Gregory Jamrok, Abraham Libbos, Josef Zimmerman
- Music librarians: Matt Slater, Samuel Stalder, Katalin Réti
- Midi transcription: Juan Arboleda, Cara Batema, Max Fourmy, Michael Kallin, Andrew Rowan, Zach Yaholkovsky
- Music engravers: Daniel Gold, Vincent Fasano, Naomi Sato

London Recording Orchestras

- Lead orchestrator: Vincent Oppido
- Orchestrators: Tim Davies, Mark Graham, Filippo Landi, Jeremy Levy, Brendan Moriak, Nathanael Tronerud
- Orchestra conductor: Ben Foster, Ben Parry, Leo Birenberg
- Orchestra contractor: Hilary Skewes, Sophie Proctor
- Recording studios: British Grove Studios, Decca Studios
- Lead recording engineer: Andy Deacon, Felipe Gutierrez
- Assistant recording engineers: Will Thomas, Chester Barrett, Julian Bishop, Steve Massey, Sarah Freeman

London Voices

- Choirmaster: Ben Parry
- Bulgarian choir contractor: Dessilava Stefanova

Budapest Scoring Orchestra

- Orchestra contractor: Bálint Sapszon
- Orchestra coordinator: Bertalan Veér
- Orchestra conductor: Peter Ilényi
- Recording studio: Rottenblier Studios
- Recording engineers: Denes Redley, Viktor Szabó
- Studio assistant: Marcell Rokosz

Instrumentalists

- Guitar: Charlie Robbins, Andrew Synowiec, Jack Gardiner
- Bass: Francesco Ojeda. Jacob Umansky
- Drums: Jake Reed, Richie Martinez
- Keys: CC
- Pipa: Jiaju Shen
- Tablas and Indian Percussion: Miles Shrewsbery
- Japanese vocals and percussion: Joji Hiroma
- Hindi vocals: Vamshikrishna Vishnudas
- Flute solos: Eliza Marshall
- Soprano solo: Sara Davey
- Throat singing: Nicholas Garrett, Jamie Wright, Fraser Collins
- Cello solos: Raman Soto

== See also ==
- Street Fighter (1994 soundtrack)
