= The Breadwinner (2026 film) =

2026 film by Eric Appel

- Theatrical release poster
- Directed by: Eric Appel
- Written by: Nate Bargatze; Dan Lagana
- Produced by: Jeremy Latcham; Nate Bargatze; Dan Lagana
- Starring: Nate Bargatze; Mandy Moore; Colin Jost; Zach Cherry; Martin Herlihy; Kumail Nanjiani; Will Forte
- Cinematography: Eigil Bryld
- Edited by: Evan Henke
- Music by: Leo Birenberg; Zach Robinson
- Production companies: TriStar Pictures; NateLand; One Man Canoe Productions
- Distributed by: Sony Pictures Releasing
- Release date: May 29, 2026
- Running time: 99 minutes
- Country: United States
- Language: English
- Budget: $25 million
- Box office: $20.2 million

The Breadwinner is a 2026 American comedy film directed by Eric Appel and written by Nate Bargatze and Dan Lagana. The film follows a father of three (Bargatze, in his film debut) who must hold down the house while his wife (Mandy Moore) is on a business trip. Colin Jost, Zach Cherry, Martin Herlihy, Kumail Nanjiani, and Will Forte also star.

The Breadwinner was released by Sony Pictures Releasing in the United States on May 29, 2026. The film received generally negative reviews from critics, with negative comparisons to Mr. Mom and grossed $20 million worldwide against a $25 million budget, becoming a box-office bomb.

== Plot ==
Nate Wilcox works as the top employee at a car dealership, while his wife, Katie Wilcox, is a stay-at-home mom, taking care of their house and three daughters, Gracie, Hadley, and Sam. Katie is able to land a deal on Shark Tank for her invention the “Star Minder,” which she created for her daughters. In order to begin producing the star minder, Katie must travel to South Korea for two weeks, requiring Nate to stay home from his job on leave to become a stay-at-home dad.

Nate soon realizes the difficulties of domestic life as he is unable to keep up with the daily necessities of cooking, cleaning, laundry, and taking care of his daughters. He ends up befriending Peter, a delivery guy, and Keegan Jones, a contractor who is terrible at his job. A fellow stay-at-home dad, Conor Ashford, attempts to befriend Nate, who ignores him. When Nate asks his mother to stay over and help, his father, Walter, arrives instead and spends his time sleeping and making a mess.

Nate, Gracie, Hadley, and Sam are all relieved when Katie returns from her trip, but she soon learns that the Star Minder's production timetable has been moved up, requiring her to leave for a second two-week trip to San Francisco. Nate declares that he will no longer try to be like Katie, instead doing things his own way. He goes back to work, buys food and clothes from Walmart, gets a horse to stop Sam from bothering other kids at school, and offers benefits for doing chores.

Nate eventually realizes that this lifestyle is untenable when he tries to be at both Hadley's spelling bee and an event at work, unable to adequately attend either. He returns home to a party that Gracie is hosting instead of studying. Breaking up the party, he upsets all of his daughters.

Soon after, Nate is informed by Keegan that their family horse Cinnamon is dead and attempts to move his body, not realizing that horses sleep lying down. This startles Cinnamon, causing him to go on a rampage and destroy much of the house before fleeing. Frustrated, Nate kicks a ball which hits Keegan's additions to the roof, causing the roof to collapse.

Katie then calls him, informing him that she will be having a livestream about the Star Minder in their now-ruined living room. Nate asks Conor to borrow his house to hold the livestream in, apologizing for ignoring Conor and promising to be friends in the future. Gracie, Hadley, Sam, Walter, Peter, and Keegan all help Nate to divert Katie and her financial backer to the Ashford house, which they have made to look like the Wilcox's. The lie is revealed, however, when Conor's wife and child arrive in the middle of the stream. Nate apologizes to Katie, expressing his admiration for and appreciation of her work taking care of the family. This, combined with the drama, goes well with the viewers, and the stream is successful. The film ends with Nate quitting his job to work in his wife's new company and the two of them sharing responsibility for home life.

== Cast ==
- Nate Bargatze as Nate Wilcox
- Mandy Moore as Katie Wilcox, Nate's wife
- Colin Jost as Conor Ashford
- Zach Cherry as Dan, Nate's boss
- Martin Herlihy as Peter
- Kumail Nanjiani as Peyton Mahar
- Will Forte as Keegan Jones
- Stella Grace Fitzgerald as Gracie Wilcox, Nate and Katie's oldest daughter
- Birdie Borria as Hadley Wilcox, Nate and Katie's middle daughter
- Charlotte Ann Tucker as Sam Wilcox, Nate and Katie's youngest daughter
- Brett Cullen as Walter Wilcox, Nate's father
- Kate Berlant as Angela Ashford, Conor's wife
- Maddox Batson as Brian

Additionally, Kevin O'Leary, Daniel Lubetzky, Robert Herjavec, Lori Greiner, and Daymond John appear as themselves.

== Production ==
In November 2024, TriStar Pictures acquired the rights to Nate Bargatze’s The Breadwinner, a preemptive acquisition while the screenplay was still being written. Wonder Project, a conservative faith-based production company, partnered to produce the movie. In February 2025, it was announced that Eric Appel would direct the film. In May 2025, Mandy Moore, Will Forte, Colin Jost, Kumail Nanjiani, Zach Cherry, Kate Berlant, and Martin Herlihy were cast in the film. Principal photography began on May 22, 2025, in Atlanta. Leo Birenberg and Zach Robinson composed the film's score, after having collaborated with Appel on Weird: The Al Yankovic Story.

== Release ==
The Breadwinner was first released in the Philippines on May 27, 2026, and in the United States on May 29, 2026. It was previously scheduled to release on March 13, 2026.

== Reception ==
=== Box office ===
In the United States and Canada, The Breadwinner was released alongside Backrooms, Pressure, and the wide expansion of Tuner and was projected to gross around $8 million from 3,300 theaters in its opening weekend. The film made $2.8 million on its first day, including $750,000 from Thursday night previews. It went on to debut to $7.5 million, finishing in fifth.

=== Critical response ===
On the review aggregator website Rotten Tomatoes, 20% of 41 critics' reviews are positive, with an average rating of 4.1/10. The website's consensus reads: "As unlikely to ruffle any feathers as it is to drum up many laughs, The Breadwinner's half-baked jokes turn Nate Bargatze's avatar of the befuddled patriarch into one stale oaf." Metacritic, which uses a weighted average, assigned the film a score of 33 out of 100, based on 13 critics, indicating "generally unfavorable" reviews. Audiences surveyed by CinemaScore gave the film an average grade of "A–" on an A+ to F scale.
