= Weird: The Al Yankovic Story (soundtrack) =

Weird: The Al Yankovic Story (Original Soundtrack)

Soundtrack album by "Weird Al" Yankovic
- Released: November 4, 2022
- Recorded: 2022
- Genres: Musical; comedy; orchestral
- Length: 77:48
- Labels: Ear Booker; Legacy Recordings
- Producers: Al Yankovic; Leo Birenberg; Zach Robinson

"Weird Al" Yankovic chronology
Squeeze Box (2017)	Weird: The Al Yankovic Story (2022)	Official UHF Score Soundtrack (2026)

Singles from Weird: The Al Yankovic Story
- 1. "Now You Know" Released: November 4, 2022

Weird: The Al Yankovic Story (Original Soundtrack) is the soundtrack album to the 2022 film Weird: The Al Yankovic Story, a satirical biopic, loosely based on the life and career of comedy musician "Weird Al" Yankovic, who is also credited as executive producer and co-writer of the film. The film, co-written and directed by Eric Appel (in his feature film directorial debut), stars Daniel Radcliffe as Yankovic, along with Evan Rachel Wood, Rainn Wilson, Toby Huss, Arturo Castro, and Julianne Nicholson in supporting roles.

The album features 46 tracks in total, consisting mostly Yankovic's early songs that were re-recorded for the album, new renditions of several of his parody songs, and original score compositions by Leo Birenberg and Zach Robinson, accompanying the remainder of it. Yankovic's original song "Now You Know" specially recorded for the film (in the closing credits) and album, was released as a single on November 4, 2022. The song was recorded in order to be eligible for a Best Original Song nomination at the 95th Academy Awards, but the prospects of an Academy Award campaign was dropped when the film's distributor, Roku, decided against a limited theatrical release for the film.

The same day, the album was released as a companion to the film by Legacy Recordings, in conjunction with its streaming premiere on The Roku Channel, though music enthusiasts mentioned it as a "surprise album" from Yankovic. It was released in CD on February 3, 2023, and a two-disc vinyl edition of the soundtrack was released on May 19, 2023.

== Production ==
=== Background ===
The original score was composed by Leo Birenberg and Zach Robinson, who also worked on Cobra Kai (2018–2025). Birenberg and Robinson discussed the film's music with Eric Appel and "Weird Al" Yankovic. While the film was being scored, Yankovic interacted with the crew through Zoom due to his touring schedule. Speaking on his creative collaboration with Yankovic, Birenberg said "he's an awesome guy to work with, because he's obviously so creative and such a visionary, but he also knows how much direction to give and to let people do their thing to make it as good as possible". On doing parody music, Robinson added that "you almost 'cue' the audience where to laugh a little bit. So the way you'll structure a specific build or a specific hit will be designed to tee up a punchline that exists in the on-camera work. And when you just play it straight, you're still hitting things and still building, but you're doing it in a way that you want the audience to be like, 'Yeah, I'm in it. This is a sweet action movie.' That's the difference."

=== Composition ===
The accordion was used as the primary instrument in the score, played by Cory Pesaturo. On using an accordion for the themes, Robinson explained that the process was "insanely difficult", because of the nature of accordion playing, essentially balancing the aspects of an accordion and piano, while constantly bellowing. "[T]hat's what makes the sound, is the air being pushed out through these reeds that are in it ... your brain needs to be doing these three totally independent things and putting them together to execute the music." Robinson added that Yankovic knew of many varieties of accordions from various countries that have different sounds for different genres. In addition to the accordion, Birenberg and Robinson used orchestral music to complement the score, but also had accordion playing in some pieces.

According to Birenberg and Robinson, some of the sequences, including the reconciliation between Yankovic and his dad, Yankovic's speech, his meeting with Dr. Demento and the dinner fight sequence, were "fun to score". The theme for Al's speech was the first cue written and presented for the film, which was appreciated by Appel for its unique composition and style. The diner fight had a John Wick-styled musical score, which was played by accordion, which Robinson described as a "fun thing to do". For the first meeting between Yankovic and Madonna, Robinson had preferred his version of Yankovic's theme, vocalized by Madonna, that resulted in a "romantic", "over-the-top" piano piece which was scored, to do "a funny Madonna vibe".

For Dr. Demento and Al's meeting, the initial version was "almost telling the audience that they should be laughing" and was rejected by Appel. The second version had a more "aspirational and emotional thread", similar to Robert Zemeckis' films from the 1990s.

=== Sound design and mixing ===
The re-recordings for the soundtrack were mixed by Tony Solis, while Anthony Vanchure served as supervising sound editor and sound design was provided by Mike James Gallagher. Phil McGowan mixed Birenberg and Robinson's score was mixed by Phil McGowan.

Both Gallagher and Vanchure discussed sound design in a music-themed film with Yankovic, who provided instructions on producing each sound uniquely. Vanchure called it a challenge "when you are doing audio for film because you have music, and that is helping tell the story, and then you also have the sound effects that we are using to help tell the story and with this movie, not only do we have Weird Al songs, but we also have a fantastic score by our composers, and it also is dependent on seeing how you mix a scene you need to keep playing it back a couple of times and go, “all right, what are we feeling, what's carrying the scene more.”"

== Track listing ==
Weird: The Al Yankovic Story (Original Soundtrack) – Digital edition
No.	Title	Writer(s)	Performer(s)	Length
1.	"You Don't Know Anything (Dialogue)"	"Weird Al" Yankovic; Eric Appel	Diedrich Bader	0:10
2.	"My Bologna" (2022 version)	Yankovic	"Weird Al" Yankovic	2:09
3.	"I Love Rocky Road" (2022 version)	Yankovic	"Weird Al" Yankovic	2:35
4.	"Another One Rides the Bus" (2022 version)	Yankovic	"Weird Al" Yankovic	2:34
5.	"Eat It"	Yankovic	"Weird Al" Yankovic	3:18
6.	"Like a Surgeon" (2022 version)	Yankovic	"Weird Al" Yankovic	3:23
7.	"Amish Paradise" (2022 version)	Yankovic	"Weird Al" Yankovic	3:19
8.	"Now You Know"	Yankovic	"Weird Al" Yankovic	5:18
9.	"Dr. Demento Opening Theme (Pico and Sepulveda)"	Eddie Cherkose; Jule Styne	The Roto Rooter Goodtime Christmas Band	1:33
10.	"Beer Barrel Polka (Roll Out the Barrel)"	Jaromír Vejvoda; Lew Brown; Vasek Zeman; Vladimir Timm	Cory Pesaturo	1:21
11.	"Helena Polka"	Traditional	Cory Pesaturo	0:31
12.	"The Chicken Dance aka The Bird Dance"	Terry Rendall; Werner Thomas	The Emeralds	2:43
13.	"Clarinet Polka"	Karol Namysłowski	"Weird Al" Yankovic	0:35
14.	"Beat on the Brat"	Joey Ramone	"Weird Al" Yankovic	0:19
15.	"Bowling with the Devil"	Yankovic	Skunk Barf	0:13
16.	"The Cobra Pit"	Leo Birenberg; Zach Robinson	Birenberg; Robinson	1:08
17.	"Demento's Pool Party"	Birenberg; Robinson	Birenberg; Robinson	4:08
18.	"You're All a Bunch of Slaves (Instrumental)"	Yankovic	"Weird Al" Yankovic	1:32
19.	"Guadalajara"	Pepe Guízar	César Chavira; César Ramírez; Omar Estrada	1:15
20.	"Back From the Dead"	Dan Light; Ramiro Rodriguez; Birenberg; Robinson	Budapest Scoring Orchestra	0:45
21.	"Weird"	Light; Rodriguez; Birenberg; Robinson	Budapest Scoring Orchestra	0:53
22.	"The Accordion"	Light; Rodriguez; Birenberg; Robinson	Budapest Scoring Orchestra	2:09
23.	"Hay Boy"	Light; Rodriguez; Birenberg; Robinson	Budapest Scoring Orchestra	0:43
24.	"The Closet"	Light; Rodriguez; Birenberg; Robinson	Budapest Scoring Orchestra	1:43
25.	"Epiphany"	Light; Rodriguez; Birenberg; Robinson	Budapest Scoring Orchestra	0:51
26.	"Cracked the Code"	Light; Rodriguez; Birenberg; Robinson	Budapest Scoring Orchestra	1:12
27.	"On the Spot"	Light; Rodriguez; Birenberg; Robinson	Budapest Scoring Orchestra	0:35
28.	"A Rare Gift"	Light; Rodriguez; Birenberg; Robinson	Budapest Scoring Orchestra	0:46
29.	"My Parents"	Light; Rodriguez; Birenberg; Robinson	Budapest Scoring Orchestra	1:11
30.	"Write Your Own Songs"	Light; Rodriguez; Birenberg; Robinson	Budapest Scoring Orchestra	1:21
31.	"LSD Trip"	Light; Rodriguez; Birenberg; Robinson	Budapest Scoring Orchestra	2:06
32.	"Al and Madonna"	Light; Rodriguez; Birenberg; Robinson	Budapest Scoring Orchestra	3:07
33.	"A Parody of 'Eat It'"	Light; Rodriguez; Birenberg; Robinson	Budapest Scoring Orchestra	1:35
34.	"Drunk Driving"	Light; Rodriguez; Birenberg; Robinson	Budapest Scoring Orchestra	0:54
35.	"You're All I've Got"	Light; Rodriguez; Birenberg; Robinson	Budapest Scoring Orchestra	0:33
36.	"Diner Kidnapping"	Light; Rodriguez; Birenberg; Robinson	Budapest Scoring Orchestra	1:22
37.	"Heart of the Jungle"	Light; Rodriguez; Birenberg; Robinson	Budapest Scoring Orchestra	1:23
38.	"Certified Platinum"	Light; Rodriguez; Birenberg; Robinson	Budapest Scoring Orchestra	1:28
39.	"It's All Business"	Light; Rodriguez; Birenberg; Robinson	Budapest Scoring Orchestra	2:37
40.	"The Factory"	Light; Rodriguez; Birenberg; Robinson	Budapest Scoring Orchestra	1:23
41.	"Dad Apologizes"	Light; Rodriguez; Birenberg; Robinson	Budapest Scoring Orchestra	2:08
42.	"Raised Amish"	Light; Rodriguez; Birenberg; Robinson	Budapest Scoring Orchestra	3:10
43.	"It's Nothing"	Light; Rodriguez; Birenberg; Robinson	Budapest Scoring Orchestra	0:57
44.	"Would You Be My Son?"	Light; Rodriguez; Birenberg; Robinson	Budapest Scoring Orchestra	0:38
45.	"Al's Speech"	Light; Rodriguez; Birenberg; Robinson	Budapest Scoring Orchestra	1:29
46.	"In Memoriam"	Light; Rodriguez; Birenberg; Robinson	Budapest Scoring Orchestra	2:34
Total length:				77:48

- On vinyl releases, disc 1 comprises tracks 1–19, and disc 2 comprises tracks 20–46.

== Credits ==
Credits adapted from Vinyl liner notes.

Musician credits

- Vocals and accordion: "Weird Al" Yankovic
- Guitars: Jim "Kimo" West
- Bass: Steve Jay
- Drums & Percussion: Jon "Bermuda" Schwartz
- Keyboards: Ruben Valtierra
- Trumpet: Wayne Bergeron
- Saxophone: Tom Evans
- Background singers: Monique Donnelly, Scottie Haskell, Lisa Popeil
- Hand music: "Musical Mike" Kieffer
- Recorded and mixed by Dave Way at the Way Station
- Additional engineering: Rafael Serrano

Score credits

- Score produced by Leo Birenberg and Zach Robinson
- Additional music: Dan Light and Ramiro Rodriguez Zamarripa
- Score coordinator: Michael Wilson
- Music editor: Andres Locsey
- Score mixer: Phil McGowan
- Orchestrator: Vincent Oppido
- Featured accordionist: Cory Pesaturo
- Featured pianist: Jeff Babko

Score recorded by the Budapest Scoring Orchestra

- Conductor: György Gulyás-Nagy
- Session producer: Bálint Sapszon
- Orchestra coordinator: Bertalan Veér
- Recording engineer: Dénes Rédly
- Music copying: Norbert Elek, Csaba Puskas, Music Preparation: Dan Brown, Lorenzo Carrano, Filippo Landi, Nathanael Tronerud
- Tony Solis: Re-recording mixer
- Anthony Vanchure: Supervising sound editor
- Mike James Gallagher: Sound eesigner
- Andres Locsey: Music editor

== Charts ==
Chart performance for Weird: The Al Yankovic Story (Original Soundtrack)
Chart (2022)	Peak position
US Billboard 200	192
US Soundtrack Albums (Billboard)	15

== Release history ==
Release dates and formats for Weird: The Al Yankovic Story (Original Soundtrack)
Region	Date	Format(s)	Label	Ref.
Various	November 4, 2022	Digital download; streaming	Legacy; Recordings	
Various	February 3, 2023	CD	Legacy; Recordings	
Various	May 19, 2023	Vinyl	Legacy; Recordings	

== Accolades ==
Award	Date of ceremony	Category	Recipient(s)	Result	Ref.
Hollywood Music in Media Awards	November 16, 2022	Best Music Themed Film, Biopic or Musical	Weird: The Al Yankovic Story	Nominated	
Hollywood Music in Media Awards	November 16, 2022	Best Original Score – Streamed Live Action Film (No Theatrical Release)	Leo Birenberg and Zach Robinson	Nominated	
Hollywood Music in Media Awards	November 16, 2022	Best Original Song – Streamed Film (No Theatrical Release)	Weird Al Yankovic for "Now You Know"	Won	
San Diego Film Critics Society	January 6, 2023	Best Use of Music	Weird: The Al Yankovic Story	Nominated	
Society of Composers & Lyricists	February 15, 2023	Outstanding Original Score for an Independent Film	Leo Birenberg and Zach Robinson	Nominated	
Society of Composers & Lyricists	February 15, 2023	Outstanding Original Song for a Comedy or Musical Visual Media Production	Weird Al Yankovic for "Now You Know"	Nominated	
St. Louis Gateway Film Critics Association	December 18, 2022	Best Soundtrack	Weird: The Al Yankovic Story	Nominated	
Grammy Awards	February 4, 2024	Best Compilation Soundtrack for Visual Media	Weird: The Al Yankovic Story	Nominated	
