= Piper Curda =

American actress (born 1997)

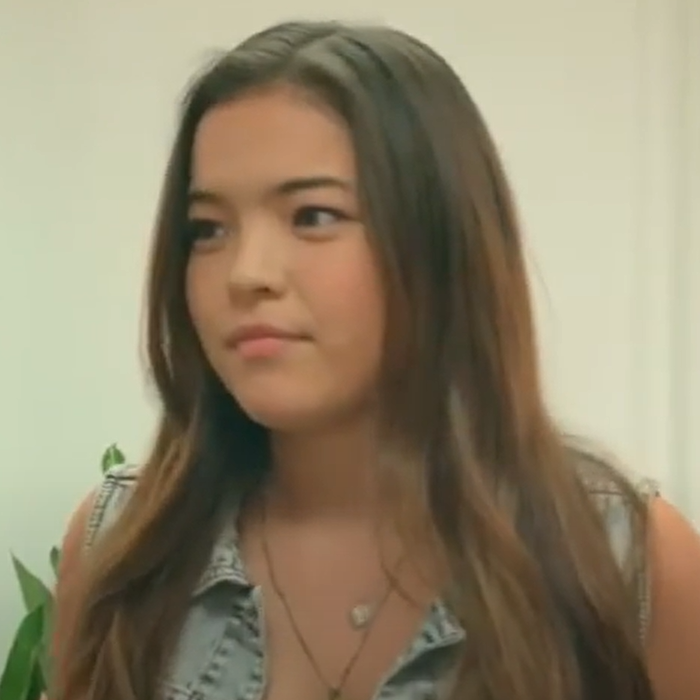
- Curda in 2014
- Born: Piper Joy Curda; August 16, 1997 (age 29); Tallahassee, Florida, U.S.
- Education: Wheaton College
- Occupation: Actress
- Years active: 2008–present
- Relatives: Saylor Curda (sister)

Piper Joy Curda (born August 16, 1997) is an American actress. She had her breakthrough with Disney Channel, starring as Kennedy in the comedy series A.N.T. Farm (2013–2014), Jasmine Kang in the sitcom I Didn't Do It (2014–2015), and Alyssa in the comedy television film Teen Beach 2 (2015). She subsequently transitioned to mainstream acting with the miniseries Youth & Consequences (2018), where she played Grace Ho. Curda led the horror film The Wretched (2020) and Pixar's Hoppers (2026), and also appeared in the drama film May December (2023).

== Early life and education ==
Piper Joy Curda was born on August 16, 1997 to U.S. Army Brig. Gen. Stephen K. Curda and Dr. Leslie Curda in Tallahassee, Florida, and was raised in Chicago. Her father is the first Korean American to reach the rank of one-star general in the United States Army Reserve. Her mother is of Scottish descent. She has four siblings: Riley, with whom she appeared in the musical The King and I; Major, who has appeared in Riverdale, Atypical, The Thundermans; and Avatar: Seven Havens Glory, who has appeared in Final Fantasy VII Remake, The Loud House, and Law & Order: Special Victims Unit; and Saylor, who stars as Maddox "Gadget" in the third and fourth season of High School Musical: The Musical: The Series. She graduated with a Bachelor of Arts in Interpersonal Communication from Wheaton College in 2019.

== Career ==
At age 12, Curda played Roly-Poly in the Broadway national tour of The 101 Dalmatians Musical. In 2011, she starred as Casey in the Disney.com series Rule the Mix. She made guest appearances in TV series including Law & Order: Special Victims Unit, Body of Proof, and Malibu Country, and had a recurring role on A.N.T. Farm during its third season.

In June 2013, she landed a main role as Jasmine in the Disney Channel sitcom I Didn't Do It, which aired from January 2014 to October 2015.

Curda released a single titled "Losing You" on January 15, 2014, and the music video on January 27, 2014.

In 2015, she appeared as Alyssa in Teen Beach 2, the sequel to 2013's Teen Beach Movie.

In 2018, she starred as Grace Ho in Anna Akana's YouTube Red series Youth & Consequences. In 2020, she starred in the horror film The Wretched. She appeared in the 2023 Netflix drama May December. She joined the cast of the 2026 Pixar animated film Hoppers, in which she voiced the lead character Mabel Tanaka.

== Personal life ==
Curda is on the asexual spectrum, and uses both she/her and they/them pronouns.

== Filmography ==
=== Film ===
Year	Title	Role	Notes
2008	Nothing like the Holidays	Neighborhood kid	Uncredited
2020	The Wretched	Mallory	
2020	American Pie Presents: Girls' Rules	Kayla	
2022	Never Better	Syd	
2022	When Time Got Louder	Jen	
2023	Back on the Strip	Gia	
2023	May December	Honor Atherton-Yoo	
2023	Showdown at the Grand	Spike	
2025	C.O.G.	Kaya	previously titled as CognAItive
2026	Hoppers	Mabel Tanaka (voice)	
2027	The Dregs		Post-production
2027	Thud		Post-production

=== Television ===
Year	Title	Role	Notes
2011	Law & Order: Special Victims Unit	Ella Mendez	Episode: "Blood Brothers"
2011	Body of Proof	Alice	Episode: "Your Number's Up"
2011–2012	Rule the Mix	Casey	Web series; lead role, 26 episodes
2012	Malibu Country	Bethany / Leyna	Episode: Pilot, "Baby Steps"
2012–2015	Randy Cunningham: 9th Grade Ninja	Debby Kang	Recurring voice role; 6 episodes
2012	Shmagreggie Saves the World	Meghan	Television film
2013	Phys Ed	Nancy	Unsold television pilot
2013	Rizzoli & Isles	Megan	Episode: "All for One"
2013	Reading Writing & Romance	Fiona	Television film
2013–2014	A.N.T. Farm	Kennedy Van Buren/Kumiko Hashimoto	Recurring role (season 3), 5 episodes
2014–2015	I Didn't Do It	Jasmine Kang	Main role
2014	Liv and Maddie	Kathy Kan	Episode: "Kathy Kan-a-Rooney"
2015	Teen Beach 2	Alyssa	Television film
2017	Just Another Nice Guy	Audrey	Main role
2018	Youth & Consequences	Grace Ho	Main role
2021	The Rookie	Billie Park	Episode: "Brave Heart"
2022	Legacies	Jen	Recurring role (season 4)
2022	NCIS: Los Angeles	Lisa Cho	
2022–2023	The Flash	Avery Ho	2 episodes
2022	Raven's Home	Rose	Episode: "Big Burger, Small Fry"
2024–present	Matlock	Kira Yu	Recurring role
2025	The Morning Show	Justice Briggs	3 episodes
2025	Watson	Annabelle Lee	Episode: "Giant Steps"

=== Video game ===
Year	Title	Role	Notes
2026	Disney Speedstorm	Mabel Tanaka	Grouped under "Featuring the Voice Talents Of"

== Discography ==
Singles
Year	Single	Album	Refs
2013	"Taking Me Higher"	While You Were Away... EP	
2014	"Losing You"	—N/a	
2014	"Messing With My Head"	—N/a	
2014	"Letting Go"	—N/a	
2015	"Happy"	—N/a	
