= Saylor Curda =

American actress and singer (born 2004)

- Born: Saylor Bell Curda; May 19, 2004 (age 22)
- Occupations: Actress; singer
- Years active: 2011–present
- Relatives: Piper Curda (sister)

Saylor Bell Curda (born May 19, 2004) is an American actress and singer. She is known for her roles as Maddox in the Disney+ series High School Musical: The Musical: The Series, Sadie Yoo on The CW series Walker, and Mayhem in the Peacock series Twisted Metal.

== Career ==
Curda appeared as Maddox in the third and fourth season of High School Musical: The Musical: The Series, for Disney+. She had originally auditioned for the role of Nini, that role ultimately went to Olivia Rodrigo. She had previously also appeared with co-star Rodrigo in New Girl.

She had a guest starring role as Sadie Yoo in the third season of crime drama series Walker on the CW in 2023. In 2025, Curda had a recurring role as Mayhem in the second season of Twisted Metal for Peacock.

== Personal life ==
Saylor Curda is American. Ethnically, she is of mixed descent with a Korean father and a Scottish mother. Curda has older siblings Glory, Major and Piper Curda who have also appeared on shows for the Disney Channel. She is also a musician and co-wrote a song with co-star Sofia Wylie.

== Filmography ==
Key
†	Denotes films that have not yet been released

=== Television ===
Year	Title	Role	Notes
2011–2012	Rule the Mix	Hannah	Recurring role
2014	I Didn't Do It	Young Jasmine	3 episodes
2015	Criminal Minds	Jolene Senarak	1 episode
2016	The Thundermans	Jocelyn	1 episode
2016	Henry Danger	Marla	2 episodes
2017	New Girl	Ramona	1 episode
2018	School of Rock	Committee Member	1 episode
2018	Whisker Haven Tales with the Palace Pets	Bloom	1 episode
2018	Station 19	Tori	1 episode
2019	Sydney to the Max	Mia	1 episode
2020	The Big Show Show	Alex	1 episode
2020	Mom	Makayla	1 episode
2021–2022	Side Hustle	Kelsey	3 episodes
2021–2022	The Blank's YPF	Genevieve	2 episodes
2022–2023	High School Musical: The Musical: The Series	Maddox	Main role (season 3); recurring role (season 4)
2023–2024	Walker	Sadie Yoo	8 episodes
2025–present	Twisted Metal	Mayhem	Recurring role (season 2)

=== Film ===
Year	Title	Role	Notes
2021	Iké Boys	Bethany	
