= Katherine East =

Canadian–British actress

- Born: Killarney, Ontario, Canada
- Education: Webber Douglas Academy of Dramatic Art
- Occupation: Actress
- Years active: 1998 - present
- Height: 6 ft (183 cm)
- Parent(s): Maurice East; Annabelle East

Katherine East is a Canadian–British actress.

Her television and film credits include Law & Order Toronto : Criminal Intent, Twisted Metal, Puck Hogs, My Babysitter's a Vampire (TV series), Being Erica, GravyTrain, Runaway, Blindness, MVP, Guns, Da Kink in My Hair, Puppets Who Kill, Puck Hogs, The Ron James Show, Covert Affairs, Saving Hope, Degrassi: The Next Generation, Sensitive Skin (Canadian TV series), Killjoys, 12 Monkeys, and The Bill. She has also appeared on stage in various productions in Canada, the United Kingdom and Georgia.

She was raised in the indigenous community of Killarney (Shebahonaning) in Ontario, Canada - an isolated 500 person fishing village with a general store, a one-room schoolhouse and frozen lake roads located on the shore of Georgian Bay. She often homeschooled in the winter on her family's sailboat in the Bahamas. After travelling solo around the world at 18 she moved to Britain to study acting. She now performs on both stage and screen.
