= Twisted Metal (TV series) =

2023 American television series

- Genre: Action comedy; Post-apocalyptic
- Based on: Twisted Metal by Sony Interactive Entertainment
- Developed by: Rhett Reese & Paul Wernick and Michael Jonathan Smith
- Showrunners: Michael Jonathan Smith; David Reed
- Starring: Anthony Mackie; Stephanie Beatriz; Joe Seanoa; Will Arnett; Thomas Haden Church; Anthony Carrigan
- Music by: Leo Birenberg; Zach Robinson
- Country of origin: United States
- Original language: English
- No. of seasons: 2
- No. of episodes: 22

Production
- Executive producers: Michael Jonathan Smith; Rhett Reese; Paul Wernick; Anthony Mackie; Will Arnett; Marc Forman; Jason Spire; Kitao Sakurai; Peter Principato; Asad Qizilbash; Carter Swan; Hermen Hulst; Grant Dekernion; David Reed
- Cinematography: James McMillan; Spencer Combs; Fraser Brown
- Editors: Michael Giambra; Heather Capps; Travis Sittard; Gina Hirsch; Peter B. Ellis
- Running time: 23–37 minutes
- Production companies: Wicked Deed; Reese Wernick Productions; Make It with Gravy; Inspire Entertainment; Electric Avenue; Artists First; PlayStation Productions; Universal Television; Sony Pictures Television (Note: Credited as Sony Pictures Television Studios in season 1)

Original release
- Network: Peacock
- Release: July 27, 2023 – present

Twisted Metal is an American post-apocalyptic action comedy television series developed by Rhett Reese, Paul Wernick, and Michael Jonathan Smith. Based on the vehicular combat video game franchise published by Sony Interactive Entertainment, the series stars Anthony Mackie, Stephanie Beatriz, Joe Seanoa, Will Arnett, Thomas Haden Church, and Anthony Carrigan.

In a post-apocalyptic wasteland, John Doe (portrayed by Mackie), a talkative delivery driver with amnesia is given a mission to traverse the desolate United States to deliver a mysterious package with unknown contents. He faces a life-altering opportunity but must confront ruthless marauders in deadly and destructive vehicles to secure a chance at a better future.

Development by Sony Pictures Television and PlayStation Productions began in May 2019, with a full season being ordered by Peacock in February 2022. The ten-episode first season debuted on Peacock in July 2023. The second season premiered in July 2025, and the series was renewed for a third season in November 2025.

== Premise ==
Set in a post-apocalyptic version of the U.S. known as the Divided States of America, the world has descended into chaos after a mysterious event known as "the Fall" has left cities in ruins and highways patrolled by criminals and warlords. John Doe, a motor-mouthed amnesiac delivery driver, known as a "milkman", with a mysterious past, is given a chance to escape his dangerous life. He must deliver a cryptic package across the lawless Wasteland, encountering eccentric characters and deadly challenges along the way, including Sweet Tooth, a killer clown who roams the roads in an ice cream truck.

== Cast and characters ==
=== Main ===
- Anthony Mackie as John Doe/Lionel
- Stephanie Beatriz as Quiet
- Joe Seanoa and Will Arnett as Sweet Tooth. Seanoa performs the character, while Arnett provides his voice.
- Thomas Haden Church as Agent Stone (season 1)
- Anthony Carrigan as Calypso (seasons 2–present)

=== Recurring ===
- Richard Cabral as Loud (season 1)
- Mike Mitchell as Stu (seasons 1–2)
- Tahj Vaughans as Mike (seasons 1–2)
- Chelle Ramos as Jamie Roberts (season 1)
- Michael Carollo as Carl Roberts (season 1)
- Tiana Okoye as Dollface/Krista/Minion (season 2)
- Patty Guggenheim as Prime Raven (season 2)
- Saylor Bell Curda as Mayhem (seasons 2–present)
- Richard de Klerk as Mr. Grimm (season 2)
- Michael James Shaw as Axel (season 2)
- Lisa Gilroy as Vermin (season 2)
- Johnno Wilson as Dave (season 2)
- Katherine East as Frostbite (season 2)
- Mark Hamill as Pope Charlie Kane (season 3)

=== Guest ===
- Lou Beatty Jr. as Tommy (season 1)
- Jared Bankens as Shepard (season 1)
- Neve Campbell as Alpha Raven (season 1)
- Jamie Neumann as Miranda Watts (season 1)
- Diany Rodriguez as Amber (season 1)
- Peg O'Keef as Granny Dread (season 1)
- Chloe Fineman as Bloody Mary (season 1)
- Wanetah Walmsley as Amy (season 1)
- Jason Mantzoukas as Preacher (season 1)
- Eden Lee as Diane (season 1)
- Clare McConnell as Dana (season 2)
- Nikki Duval as Ashley (season 2)
- Dan Beirne as Jeremy (season 2)
- Lily Gao as Jessica (season 2)
- Jon Daly as Emperor (season 2)
- André Dae Kim as Chuckie Floop (season 2)
- Tyler Johnston as Deacon (season 2)
- Jimmi Simpson as the voice of Quatro (season 2)
- Devon Sawa as Harold (season 2)

== Episodes ==
Season	Episodes	Originally released	
Season	Episodes	First released	Last released
1	10	July 27, 2023	
2	12	July 31, 2025	August 28, 2025

=== Season 1 (2023) ===
No. overall	No. in season	Title	Directed by	Written by	Original release date
1	1	"WLUDRV"	Kitao Sakurai	Teleplay by : Michael Jonathan Smith; Story by : Rhett Reese & Paul Wernick and Michael Jonathan Smith	July 27, 2023
In a post-apocalyptic world after a large-scale cyber attack, cities have become walled fortresses. Criminals have been exiled outside the cities and live in a lawless area. Outside of the cities, some individuals work as "milkmen", transporting goods between cities. One milkman, John Doe, is transporting goods to New San Francisco and meets with the Chief Operations Officer of the city, Raven. Raven asks John to retrieve a package from New Chicago, in exchange for citizenship in New San Francisco. Raven introduces John to her husband, Noah, and child, Dove, and treats him to a nice dinner. After John leaves to retrieve the package, Raven reveals that her offer has been a setup, and she does not have a child or a spouse. Outside of the cities, a brother and sister, Loud and Quiet, are fleeing from Agent Stone and his deputy, Shepard. They are apprehended, and given the choice for one of them to kill themselves, or they both die. Loud kills himself, and Quiet is branded. John travels through Las Vegas on his way to New Chicago when he encounters Quiet and realizes that she had previously tried to break into his car. They begin to fight but decide to team up after they are pursued by a psychopathic clown, Sweet Tooth.
2	2	"3RNCRCS"	Kitao Sakurai	Michael Jonathan Smith	July 27, 2023
Quiet and John flee from Sweet Tooth in Las Vegas, and they argue again over a car. They retreat into a casino, and Quiet flees into a vent. John is apprehended by Sweet Tooth, who insists that John must see his show. Sweet Tooth reveals that Quiet is also his prisoner, but John convinces him to release her. Sweet Tooth puts on a show and asks for their feedback; he becomes angry when John compliments him. Quiet, who had previously acted as if she was mute, criticizes the show. Sweet Tooth appreciates their honesty and releases them. Outside Las Vegas, cannibals are preparing to eat former security guards Mike and Stu, who are subsequently rescued by Agent Stone. Stone offers them the chance to join his unit if they kill people attempting to steal supplies. After they join Stone, Mike and Stu are at a checkpoint that John and Quiet attempt to drive through. Quiet recognizes Shepard, who was present when Loud killed himself, and she tries to attack him. Quiet and John are both stunned and apprehended at the Hoover Dam.
3	3	"NTHLAW1"	Jude Weng	Grant Dekernion	July 27, 2023
John and Quiet are brought in for questioning. Agent Stone is curious about John's map, which shows a route to New Chicago that avoids all of Stone's checkpoints. In flashbacks to 2002, Stone is a disrespected police officer who uses the end of civilization to reinvent himself as the arbiter of law and order. Stone orders for John and Quiet to be killed, but they convince Stu to spare them and to escape with them. Stu brings John back to his car, while Quiet kills Shepard and learns that Stone has traveled to Topeka. The three of them try to flee together, but Stu is injured by the car and captured by Mike. John and Quiet flee, and she asks him to take her to Topeka.
4	4	"WHZDARE"	Maggie Carey	Shaun Diston	July 27, 2023
While traveling to Topeka, John and Quiet are caught by a group of survivors living in trucks. Their captor, Watts, introduces them to an elderly woman, Granny, and asks John to retrieve some plants in exchange for weapons for his car. Together with Quiet, he travels to meet Watts's old lover, Amber, who is suspicious and plans to kill them. John shows her Granny's receipt, and Amber lets them leave with the plants. They are pursued by Holy Men and hide in a movie theater. John washes Quiet's jacket, which upsets her, as it still has blood from her dead brother. They return the plants to Granny, who concocts a tea that she drinks to kill herself. The survivors have a funeral for Granny, Quiet forgives John, and the two leave for Topeka.
5	5	"CRZSRDS"	Jude Weng	Francesca Gailes & Jacqueline J. Gailes	July 27, 2023
Following their departure from the truck convoy, John and Quiet recover their stolen items from the Vultures, a roaming gang of scavengers they had encountered before. Quiet drugs John, wanting to kill Stone on her own. Meanwhile, at the dam outpost, Stu is awaiting execution, when Sweet Tooth raids the outpost, killing all of Stone's henchmen and freeing the death row prisoners who join him. Stu notices Mike hiding but doesn't tell Sweet Tooth, thus sparing his life. Quiet infiltrates a police car and disguises herself as one of Stone's agents. She begins to suffer hallucinations of her late brother. Her cover is blown due to her bionic finger, forcing her to go head-to-head with Stone in battle. Stone overpowers her and attempts to kill her with machine guns. John, having missed Quiet, appears and shoots Stone with his only missile. Quiet, weak from her injuries, blacks out, and John carries her to safety.
6	6	"DRVTHRU"	Maggie Carey	Alison Tafel	July 27, 2023
While waiting out a storm in the Astral Burger, a former fast-food restaurant, Quiet is angry that John did not kill Stone, but then the two have sex in the restaurant's ball pit. Quiet reflects upon her former life: she and Loud worked picking oranges, and Quiet got them a contract to work for four years of indentured servitude in a human settlement in exchange for beachfront property. Three years later, Quiet and Loud were both working separately in the OC community, where servants were abused, including amputations, as punishment. Quiet's middle finger was removed by her master and worn on a necklace. At the Astral Burger, she found Loud, who worked there. An active shooter outside caused the restaurant to be locked down, and Quiet snuck away to talk to Loud. They were discovered by the manager, who promised to punish Loud. Outside, the shooter screamed that the promise of land was a lie and was subsequently shot by law enforcement. That night, the manager cut off Loud's ear and prepared to hand him over to law enforcement, but the officers and the manager were killed by Quiet, who had escaped from her master. Quiet and Loud fled the settlement together. In the present day, Quiet and John bond, and they drive toward New Chicago.
7	7	"NUTH0UZ"	Bill Benz	Alyssa Forleiter	July 27, 2023
Sweet Tooth and other escaped prisoners arrive at an asylum. Sweet Tooth takes Stu to his old cell, where he reveals that he was a former child actor, named "Marcus Kane", who killed a dog on his show out of jealousy. After the collapse of society, he locked his mother and stepfather in his cell. He destroys their skeletons, and he and Stu discover that the rest of the prisoners have been killed by Stone, with Mike working for him. Mike goes to ensure everyone is dead but is captured by Sweet Tooth. John and Quiet arrive in New Chicago, where they go into an underground room and receive the package from Calypso. On their drive back, they stop at a milkman rest stop, where they encounter Mary, one of John's former lovers. She is jealous of his relationship with Quiet and learns that John is conducting this run to get into New San Francisco. She informs the other milkmen, and a fight over his package begins. John and Quiet kill everyone and escape. As they leave, a woman sends a message to Stone, informing him of their destination.
8	8	"EV3L1N"	Bill Benz	Teleplay by : Alyssa Forleiter & Alison Tafel; Story by : Ify Nwadiwe	July 27, 2023
In a flashback to his childhood, John has a bad car accident and is unable to remember details about his life. While trying to survive, he discovers Evelyn, an orange Subaru Impreza rallying car. While staying in Evelyn, he survives an encounter with cannibals and drives to a salvage yard, and works on his car. In the present, Quiet and John stop to look for a photograph that fell out of his car. While they are away, several Holy Men steal Evelyn. John and Quiet chase after them to the Holy Men encampment, where they are led by Preacher. John challenges Preacher to a fight, which he loses and is imprisoned. Quiet steals a car and rescues John, but he insists he must retrieve Evelyn. Quiet leaves while John returns to his car, where he fights Preacher again. Preacher shoots the car's gas tank, and it explodes. The Holy Men flee, and John creates a memorial for Evelyn.
9	9	"R04DK11"	Kitao Sakurai	Grant Dekernion & Becca Black	July 27, 2023
John finds a car at the Holy Men encampment and leaves. Quiet has an accident and is rescued by Watts's convoy, with John's help. On board, she reconnects with John. She admits that she is upset that he chose Evelyn over her, and he insists that he considers her an equal partner. The convoy comes under attack from Stone's men. After rearming and weaponizing their new car, a Chevrolet Camaro, John and Quiet decide to name it "Roadkill". John, Quiet, Amber, and Miranda drive into Stone's blockade. Stone's men prepare to attack them but are surprised by the arrival of Sweet Tooth, who fires missiles at them.
10	10	"SHNGRLA"	Kitao Sakurai	Michael Jonathan Smith	July 27, 2023
During a showdown at a racetrack, Amber and Sweet Tooth are incapacitated. John and Quiet are able to defeat Stone and leave him with the option of death by suicide. Sweet Tooth tries to get Stu to kill Mike, but Stu shoots Sweet Tooth instead and leaves him for dead. John and Quiet return to New San Francisco and deliver the package to Raven. John attempts to bring Quiet inside but is not allowed to. He announces that he won't enter either, but Quiet shoots him to force him to be taken into New San Francisco, and leaves. A month later, John is bored with his life in the settlement, and Quiet is stealing deliveries from milkmen and giving them to people outside settlements. John says that he wants to leave, and Raven takes him to his childhood home. She tries to convince him to stay, but he insists on leaving. Raven has John held at gunpoint and tells him that he will be her driver in a tournament with other cities to win the ultimate prize from Calypso. Outside the city, Quiet's car is hindered by a team of masked women; their leader reveals that she is John's sister. Stu and Mike relax on a beach and are surprised when Sweet Tooth arrives; he kills Mike and drags Stu away.

=== Season 2 (2025) ===
No. overall	No. in season	Title	Directed by	Written by	Original release date
11	1	"PRSRPNT"	Phil Sgriccia	Michael Jonathan Smith & Jorge Thomson	July 31, 2025
In a flashback to before the Fall, a young Raven and her friend Kelly play a prank on one of their classmates, but Kelly falls, hits her head, and is found floating face down in a pool. In the current time, John is Prime Raven's prisoner in New San Francisco, where he is forced to prepare for the Twisted Metal tournament. At the same time, Quiet has joined the Dolls, a group of vigilantes led by Dollface, who fight to take down the cities and the elite. John breaks into Raven's garage to find his car and discovers Kelly still alive on life support in the back of an ambulance. A broadcast goes out on all channels from Calypso, announcing the start of his tournament in one week, and that the single winner will be granted their one wish. Shortly after John escapes in an ambulance, he is captured by the Dolls but is recognized by Quiet and Dollface, who John learns is his sister.
12	2	"DOLF4C3"	Phil Sgriccia	Alison Tafel	July 31, 2025
In a flashback, Dollface creates the dolls by organizing with other women. In the current timeline, John wakes up in the Dolls' camp, where he finds that Quiet has been maintaining his car. He tries to convince her to flee with him, but she insists that she wants to enter the tournament. She encourages him to reconnect with Dollface, whom he does not remember due to his injuries. John confronts Dollface and claims that she brainwashed Quiet, but Dollface insists that she cannot control her. Quiet catches a young woman, Mayhem, who was attempting to rob the camp. After Quiet beats John in a race to determine who among the Dolls will enter the tournament, they fight to protect Mayhem, reconnect, and agree to enter the tournament together. The group leaves for Diesel City to get weapons. In an insane asylum, Mr. Grimm is freed from solitary confinement to drive in the tournament.
13	3	"T3STDRV"	Bill Benz	Hadiyah Robinson	July 31, 2025
After escaping the asylum, Grimm kills several people in a cemetery, absorbing their souls, and flees on a motorcycle. On the way to Diesel City, Quiet tricks John into riding with his sister. Dollface becomes frustrated that John cannot remember his past and takes him to a drive-in movie theater they used to visit as kids. There, they are chased by Axel, a human-robot hybrid. They kill Axel's creator and free Axel. Grimm kills two of the Dolls, Ashley and Jeremy. While driving alone, Quiet finds Mayhem hiding in the trunk of her car. After an argument, she attempts to teach Mayhem to drive, but they are soon attacked by Grimm. They flee as Axel fights with Grimm. The group arrives outside Diesel City, and Dollface announces her intention to steal weapons.
14	4	"LZGTBZY"	Bill Benz	Grant Dekernion	August 7, 2025
Dollface, John, and Quiet infiltrate and steal weapons from Diesel City, with the help of Mayhem. John and Quiet dress up as insiders and gain access to the inner sanctum, where insider representatives bid on high-tech weaponry. Stu is kidnapped by the inhabitants of Diesel City for an orgy and later kills them with the weapons he stole from the vault. John and Quiet sneak out of the party and have sex inside the weapons vault and cause a fire that sets the alarm off. Dollface and Sweet Tooth find an EMP device and fight each other for it. John and Quiet escape, successfully retrieving several weapons. Dollface, with Mayhem's help, defeats Sweet Tooth and steals the EMP, which they intend to use during the tournament.
15	5	"ONURMRK"	Phil Sgriccia	Shaun Diston	August 7, 2025
After collecting their weapons in Diesel City, the contestants proceed to the Twisted Metal tournament qualifying round. Before the start of the tournament, Mayhem tries to pit everyone against each other. Mike survived Sweet Tooth's attack and is one of the contestants, having been rescued by Dave, a self-confessed former cannibal. Dave and Mike join the contest as a team, driving the Hammerhead. The tournament has 23 contestants grouped into 17 teams. In the qualifying round, Calypso tasks each contestant to deliver a package to Tournament City. The package has three health bars and when depleted, it will cause the elimination of that contestant by an air strike. John and Quiet (Roadkill), Dollface, Sweet Tooth and Stu, Grimm, Axel, Dave and Mike (Hammerhead), Chuckie Floop (Spectre), Mayhem, Raven, the Holy Men with a baby Preacher (Brimstone), Frostbite, the Knights of Nebraska, Vulture, Billy Ray Stillwell (Junkyard Dog), Vermin, Death Warrant, and several other drivers battle it out on an airstrip. A contestant is killed by Dollface at the start of the round. Death Warrant is killed by an air strike when his package health bar is depleted, which also results in the death of another driver. Mayhem and Chucky Floop battle, and John and Quiet decide to rescue Mayhem despite being reluctant to do so.
16	6	"MKAW1SH"	Phil Sgriccia	Alyssa Forleiter	August 14, 2025
In a flashback, John meets a vagabond Calypso painting "Calypso is Real" on a road sign. Calypso asks for John's wish, and John answers that he desires to have a home, a family, and a garage to park his car, Evelyn. Suddenly, Calypso vanishes. At the qualifying round, Roadkill rescues Mayhem by fending off Spectre and Grimm with the assistance of Dollface. Quiet kills Junkyard Dog before he unleashes his special weapon on Roadkill and Mayhem. Grimm shoots Dollface, causing her to lose focus. The Knights of Nebraska pierce Dollface in the stomach, and she sacrifices herself to be killed in an airstrike along with the Knights of Nebraska. The remaining contestants are taken to a high school, where they are given orientation, medical checkups, and accommodation. Calypso warns Raven not to mess with the tournament. John and Quiet contemplate Dollface's death. Later, each contestant is asked for their wish—one per car. Quiet wishes for the walls to come down around the fortified cities, while John makes a separate wish to bring Dollface back to life, despite him and Quiet being in one car.
17	7	"H1TNRVN"	Iain B. MacDonald	Gilli Nissim	August 14, 2025
In the first round of the tournament, called Warehouse District Warfare, the objective is for each contestant to find one of the eight passes to go through the exit. The locations of the passes are hidden and are marked by red smoke. Roadkill, who finished last in the qualifying round, are given a one-minute headstart and a radar by Calypso. While driving, John is distracted by grief for his sister and contemplating the wish he kept from Quiet. Quiet notices John's erratic behavior, prompting her to become Roadkill's driver. They arrive at the first collectible but are unable to get the pass. Mayhem kills Chuckie and steals the pass and his car Spectre, which is fitted with an AI named Quattro. The Holy Men are killed when the boomerang missile backfires on them, but the baby Preacher (who holds a pass) survives unscathed and is picked up by Roadkill to complete the round. Grimm survives by jumping inside Sweet Tooth's truck, just as Sweet Tooth (who has a pass) crosses the finish line. John and Quiet are the last contestants to complete the first round, while the baby is taken by Calypso. Frostbite, Raven, Dave and Mike, Vermin, Axel, Sweet Tooth and Stu, Mayhem, John and Quiet, and Grimm survive the first round. John confesses to Quiet that he made his own wish.
18	8	"SDDNDTH"	Iain B. MacDonald	Taylor Santiago Berger	August 21, 2025
In a flashback, Axel works as a hitman to pay off his debts and is assigned to kill drug dealers in a house. However, one of the targets is a baby girl, and he is unable to kill her. Later on, the Vultures raid his camp, and the baby is taken from him. In the present, John and Quiet have a falling out, while Sweet Tooth learns that he is infertile. As a bonus round, Calypso sends the Apocalypse Nine to kill the contestants, and the building goes into lockdown, forcing the contestants to team up to survive. Grimm is locked outside the school, while the remaining contestants inside fight for their lives. Frostbite is killed by one of the Apocalypse Nine when her head is crushed by a treadmill. Quiet, Raven, and Vermin team up and kill several of the Apocalypse Nine, while Axel, Dave, Mike,.and Stu stay inside a room. The trio interview Axel and try to encourage him so he can pick up his strength and kill the remaining Apocalypse Nine, while John and Mayhem kill one member by bisecting his head. Quiet, Raven, Vermin, John, Mayhem, Axel, Dave, Mike, Stu, and Axel meet up in a hall, where Axel finally finds courage and massacres and dismembers the remaining Apocalypse Nine, ending their killing spree. At sunrise, John and Quiet rekindle their relationship. However, when they exit the room, they are back in the wishing well chamber.
19	9	"VAVAVUM"	Bertie Ellwood	Becca Black	August 21, 2025
Inside the wishing well room with Calypso, John and Quiet request that John's wish to bring Krista/Dollface back to life be revoked. Calypso makes them drink from the well to solve their wish problem. Before the party starts, Calypso and the contestants perform a ritual by offering their blood. However, Axel is skipped due to his machine arms. Before round two of the tournament starts, Calypso invites all contestants to take part in the Wintertide Solstice Promenade, where they dress up and party together in the gym all night in order to grow closer together. Quiet is suspicious of the party, but John tries to persuade her that everything is fine. Stu offends Dave with a cannibal joke and later goes to reconcile with him, but instead, he finds him eating dismembered parts of Frostbite. After Dave reveals that he is still a cannibal, Stu and Dave fight, and Dave accidentally dies by impaling his head on a hook. Stu frames his death to look like a suicide and goes back to the party. Axel discovers that Mayhem is the baby he saved during his hitman years. Sweet Tooth becomes jealous of Grimm because of his dance, which impresses the other contestants. Meanwhile, Grimm develops feelings for Vermin, and they have sex. However, Sweet Tooth tells Vermin that she was just a bet, making her angry at Grimm. Later on, Grimm burns Harold the paper bag in front of Sweet Tooth, which Sweet Tooth sees as a real person. A gas is released in the party, which knocks the contestants unconscious as Calypso watches from afar. John wakes up inside his car as a "Watkyn's storm" approaches. Calypso introduces a penultimate round.
20	10	"M4YH3M"	Bertie Ellwood	Shaun Diston & Kirsten Rezazadeh-Jakob	August 28, 2025
In the penultimate round, Axel, John, Quiet, Vermin, Mayhem, and Raven are tasked with eliminating a contestant in a lightning-filled battleground. Meanwhile, Calypso investigates the murder of Dave and Harold, and contestants such as Sweet Tooth, Mike, Grimm, and Stu are exempted from the round because of their involvement in the murders. Calypso acquits Stu in Dave's death after Stu tells them the truth. Calypso finds Grimm guilty for killing Harold, but Sweet Tooth asks to kill him in the final round, while Calypso takes all the souls Grimm stole. In the battle, Vermin is assigned to kill John, but she is killed by Raven using her car's lightning feature. Vermin is ejected from her vehicle as it explodes, and she is killed by a lightning strike. Quiet is assigned to kill Mayhem, but before she does, Raven shoots at Spectre, eliminating Mayhem from the contest and seemingly killing her. However, Mayhem survives and is rescued by John and Quiet. Just as Raven is about to kill John, Quiet, and Mayhem, Axel sacrifices himself to save Mayhem by blocking Raven's attack. Raven, John, and Quiet survive the penultimate round. It is revealed that Mayhem's wish is to have a place where she can belong. Mayhem recuperates at the school, and Stu leaves Sweet Tooth to team up with Mike. While recuperating, Mayhem follows Calypso through a secret door and finds out that he is creating Minion as the final boss of the tournament. Just as Mayhem is about to reveal this to John and Quiet, she overhears the duo discussing that she has become a liability for them. Saddened, she leaves the school.
21	11	"OHLYNTE"	Bill Benz	Grant Dekernion	August 28, 2025
Mayhem's escape attempt is thwarted by Calypso, and he makes her a spectator in the final round for seeing something she shouldn't have. In the final round of the tournament, John, Quiet, Sweet Tooth, Grimm, Raven, Mike, and Stu battle in a death-match in an arena filled with spectators made up of both Insiders and Outsiders. Raven upends Sweet Tooth's truck while using a shield, which angers Calypso, who uses his powers to disable it. Quiet attacks Hammerhead and kills Mike, while Stu crashes the car. Meanwhile, John uses the Boomerang missile to defeat Raven. A dying Raven imagines Kelly reaching out a hand for her as she dies. John and Quiet take out Grimm's bike, which leaves him to fight Sweet Tooth on foot. Grimm is killed when Sweet Tooth throws him under Quiet and John's car. Minion is dropped from a helicopter, beats Sweet Tooth severely, and blasts John out of his car, eliminating him as a contestant. Quiet plows into Minion and dives from Roadkill while it explodes, eliminating herself from the tournament but taking Minion with her. As the other cars are eliminated, Stu finds himself as the winner of the Twisted Metal tournament. As Mayhem kills one of Calypso's guards and tries to leave, Calypso blows up the Insider spectator stand, killing the entire audience.
22	12	"NUY3ARZ"	Bill Benz	Michael Jonathan Smith	August 28, 2025
In a flashback to Virginia in 1585, Calypso emerges from a well that looks similar to the wishing well. In the early 2000s, just before the Fall, Calypso pitches Twisted Metal to NBC as a car-combat reality show, which is turned down. Back at the arena, Quiet and Mayhem use Sweet Tooth's truck to jump-start John's heart. Meanwhile, the body of Sweet Tooth is taken away by an unknown group. Quiet, John, and Mayhem drive away in the truck, following John's crudely drawn map to his family's rural retreat. Calypso grants Stu's wish as he had said it: to be far away from everything and safe with Mike. Stu finds himself in a capsule in outer space, with the corpse of Mike. Months later, the idyllic lives of John, Quiet, and Mayhem are cut short when a TV broadcast reveals that Calypso has framed them for the death of the Insiders. The Insider cities have formed alliances and declared war on the Outsiders and are now hunting down John and Quiet. Meanwhile, Minion suddenly appears and attacks the trio. Minion is revealed to be Krista, and the trio are rescued by Stu, who has made his way back to Earth. John, Quiet, Mayhem, and Stu escape in Sweet Tooth's truck, though Minion/Krista is still on the hunt for them. At the end, John decides to hunt down and kill Calypso. Meanwhile, a chained Sweet Tooth is being brought to his father, Charlie Kane, by a taxi driver. Later, the hamster from the place where Axel was created is missing, hinting that Axel is alive.

== Production ==
=== Development ===
In May 2019, during an investor relations presentation, Sony Pictures Television confirmed that it was developing a television series based on the video game series Twisted Metal. By February 2021, the series was announced, with Will Arnett, Rhett Reese, Michael Jonathan Smith, and Paul Wernick on board to executive-produce. Smith serves as showrunner and wrote the story based on an original take by Reese and Wernick. In February 2022, the half-hour action-comedy was greenlit by Peacock. The following month, Kitao Sakurai joined as an executive producer in addition to directing multiple episodes.

In December 2023, Peacock renewed the series for a second season. In November 2025, the show was renewed for a third season, with David Reed replacing Michael Jonathan Smith as showrunner.

=== Casting ===
In September 2021, Anthony Mackie served as one of the executive producers and was the first to be cast, as John Doe. In May 2022, Stephanie Beatriz and Thomas Haden Church were cast in starring roles as Quiet and Agent Stone, respectively. Neve Campbell was cast in a recurring role as Raven.

In June, Will Arnett joined the cast, voicing Sweet Tooth. Pro-wrestler Samoa Joe physically portrays Sweet Tooth. Richard Cabral was cast as Beatriz's overprotective brother, Loud. Tahj Vaughans and Mike Mitchell portray best friends Mike and Stu. Lou Beatty Jr. plays Tommy.

For the second season, Anthony Carrigan joined the main cast as Calypso, while Richard de Klerk, Patty Guggenheim, and Tiana Okoye have recurring guest roles as Mr. Grimm, Raven, and Dollface, respectively. In August 2024, Saylor Bell Curda, Michael James Shaw, and Lisa Gilroy joined the cast in recurring roles as Mayhem, Axel, and Vermin, respectively.

In April 2026, it was announced that Mitchell had been let go from the series following a creative overhaul. In June, Mark Hamill joined the cast in a recurring role as Pope Charlie Kane.

=== Filming ===
The first season began principal photography in May 2022 in New Orleans and wrapped that August. It had an estimated budget (before tax incentives) of $45 million. Shooting in New Orleans in the summer came with some challenges. Michael Jonathan Smith told NOLA.com in an interview, "We dealt with lightning delays, hurricane threats, extreme heat and cars that wouldn't do as they were told".

Production for the second season moved to Ontario, Canada. Filming began on July 17 and was originally scheduled to end on November 19, 2024, but instead wrapped early, on October 30. Shooting took place at Cambridge City Hall, which was turned into the city hall for "New San Francisco". In early September, scenes were shot at a former bakery across from the closed Delta Secondary School in Hamilton.

Filming for the third season began in Toronto in June 2026, and concluded in August.

=== Music ===
The score was composed by Leo Birenberg and Zach Robinson, for which they drew heavily from 2000s nu-metal. Numerous 1990s and 2000s songs from various genres are also featured in the episodes.

== Release ==
Twisted Metal premiered on Peacock on July 27, 2023, with all ten episodes released together. Paramount+ picked up the streaming rights for Canada and the United Kingdom (the show premiering in the latter region on March 21, 2024), while it is streamed on Stan in Australia.

The second season began streaming on July 31, 2025, and consisted of 12 episodes. The first three episodes premiered on the same day, with the remaining episodes released weekly through August 28, 2025.

In October 2026, Sony Pictures released the miniseries Sweet Tooth Presents.

== Reception ==
=== Critical response ===
Critical response of Twisted Metal
Season	Rotten Tomatoes	Metacritic
1	67% (49 reviews)	55/100 (22 reviews)
2	92% (25 reviews)	74/100 (6 reviews)

On the review aggregator website Rotten Tomatoes, 67% of 49 critics' reviews are positive, with an average rating of 5.9/10. The website's consensus reads: "An enjoyable blast of cartoonishly violent mayhem, Twisted Metal sometimes struggles to flesh out its source material, but ultimately offers an adaptation with surprising depth." Metacritic, which uses a weighted average, assigned the first season a score of 55 out of 100, based on 22 reviews, indicating "mixed or average reviews".

Daniel Fienberg of The Hollywood Reporter gave the first season a positive review, saying, "It's a bit odd for any series to spend a season opening up its world only to set up a seemingly less expansive (if more expensive) second season, but fans will probably be happy. Generally, Twisted Metal is fast and fun and definitely won't be in the running for any Emmys, much less 24. And that's OK!" Variety's Alison Herman gave it a negative review: "The story of Twisted Metal is thin and packed with tropes; it's still an undertaking to get there from no story at all. The rest of the industry should ask whether that effort was worth it before the next wave of game TV starts to break".

Daniel Kurland of Bloody Disgusting gave the series a two-and-half out of five rating. He wrote, "Twisted Metal is dumb fun that's big, broad, and unabashedly bloody. It's nowhere near the level of The Last of Us or even SyFy's Blood Drive, but it's campy escapism that doesn't ask much of its audience".

The second season has a 92% approval rating on Rotten Tomatoes, based on 25 critic reviews. The website's critics' consensus states: "Putting the pedal to Twisted Metal, this second season gains momentum as it revs up the race and raises the stakes." On Metacritic, the second season has a score of 74 out of 100, based on six reviews, indicating "generally favorable reviews".

=== Viewership ===
After two weeks, the series became Peacock's "most-binged" comedy premiere to date. According to Nielsen data, it was one of the most-watched streaming originals, with 400 million viewing minutes in the weekend following its premiere.

=== Awards and nominations ===
Award	Date of ceremony	Category	Recipient(s) and nominee(s)	Result	Ref.
The Game Awards	December 7, 2023	Best Adaptation	Twisted Metal	Nominated	
Imagen Awards	September 8, 2024	Best Actress – Comedy (Television)	Stephanie Beatriz	Nominated	
Primetime Creative Arts Emmy Awards	September 7–8, 2024	Outstanding Stunt Coordination	Clay Cullen	Nominated	
Imagen Awards	August 21, 2026	Best Actor – Comedy	Stephanie Beatriz	Won (tie)	
