= Eric Appel =

American film director

- Born: Eric Appel; August 13, 1980 (age 46); Endicott, New York, United States
- Occupations: Director, producer, writer
- Spouse: Johanna Parker Appel

Eric Appel (born August 13, 1980) is an American filmmaker working in television, film, and commercials.

== Early life and education ==
Originally from Endicott, New York, Appel attended the Art Institute of Pittsburgh, majoring in computer animation.

Describing his childhood interests, Appel said, "I was always playing around with video cameras, but I was also the kid that drew cartoons. It's weird. I was so obsessed with movies and television, but nobody ever told me that I should go to film school... [W]hen I decided to go to school for animation, it felt like a no-brainer. However, when I actually went away to college, I realized that I had made a mistake (and also that I wasn't that great at drawing). I actually spent more time working on videos with my roommate, who was majoring in video production, than I did working on my own project."

== Career ==
While in college, Appel also began performing improv comedy after his girlfriend brought him to a "show at the University of Pittsburgh called "Friday Nite Improvs", where anyone from the audience could volunteer to go up on stage and perform these improv games." After moving to New York City, Appel started taking classes at the Upright Citizens Brigade Theater, "and it wasn't long before I was basically living at the theatre. I became very involved very quickly. [I was] taking improv classes, interning, running the lights for shows and really helping out in any way that I could so I could just be around comedy as much as possible."

While still in New York, Appel got a job writing for The Andy Milonakis Show, then moved to Los Angeles for that show's third season when its production was relocated to California. He subsequently wrote for Crank Yankers and Human Giant, then went to work for the comedy website Funny or Die. "Funny or Die was such a young company when they hired me...there were about eight of us all sitting around a large dining room table on laptops. Every day a few people would disappear to go shoot some shit and then the next day they would be sitting next to you editing it. Then it would go up on the site and it would either get a million hits or nobody would watch it and it would disappear and then it was on to the next thing. Everyone there worked at their own pace and you were encouraged to just go pick up a camera and make something...I used this as an opportunity to start directing my own sketches and quickly found out that not only do I like directing more than writing, but also that I'm better at it."

Appel would go on to extensively direct series television, with credits including Eagleheart, NTSF:SD:SUV, The Office, New Girl, Selfie, Brooklyn Nine-Nine, Son of Zorn, Die Hart and The Afterparty.

In 2022, Appel made his feature directorial debut with Weird: The Al Yankovic Story, based on a Funny or Die short that he directed twelve years earlier. The film won two Emmy Awards including Outstanding Television Movie and Outstanding Music Composition For A Limited Or Anthology Series, Movie Or Special (Original Dramatic Score). The film further garnered eight Emmy nominations. The film also won a Critics Choice Award for Best Made for Television Movie.

He appeared on the Faux Real Podcast with Devlin Wilder on December 4, 2023.

== Filmography ==
=== Feature films ===
Year	Title	Director	Writer	Producer	Notes
2022	Weird: The Al Yankovic Story	Yes	Yes	Yes	Won 2 Emmys & received 8 nominations
2023	Die Hart	Yes	No	No	Season 1 of Die Hart re-edited into a feature film
2024	Die Hart 2: Die Harter	Yes	No	Executive	Season 2 of Die Hart re-edited into a feature film
2026	The Breadwinner	Yes	No	No	
