= Weird: The Al Yankovic Story =

2022 film by Eric Appel

- Release poster
- Directed by: Eric Appel
- Written by: Al Yankovic; Eric Appel
- Produced by: Mike Farah; Joe Farrell; Whitney Hodack; Tim Headington; Lia Buman; Max Silva; Al Yankovic; Eric Appel
- Starring: Daniel Radcliffe; Evan Rachel Wood; Rainn Wilson; Toby Huss; Julianne Nicholson
- Cinematography: Ross Riege
- Edited by: Jamie Kennedy
- Music by: Leo Birenberg; Zach Robinson
- Production companies: Funny or Die; Tango Entertainment; Ear Booker Productions
- Distributed by: The Roku Channel
- Release dates: September 8, 2022 (TIFF); November 4, 2022 (United States)
- Running time: 108 minutes
- Country: United States
- Language: English
- Budget: $8 million

Weird: The Al Yankovic Story is a 2022 American biographical musical parody film directed by Eric Appel, in his feature directorial debut, from a screenplay he co-wrote with Al Yankovic. The film is a satire on musical biopics and is loosely based on Yankovic's life and career as an accordionist and parody songwriter. It stars Daniel Radcliffe as Yankovic, along with Evan Rachel Wood, Rainn Wilson, Toby Huss and Julianne Nicholson in supporting roles.

A fake trailer for a satirical biographical film was produced by Appel for Funny or Die in 2010. Yankovic would screen the trailer at his concerts, which made fans question when a full-length film would be made and led Yankovic and Appel to develop the film's concept together. Weird: The Al Yankovic Story was filmed on a budget of around $8 million over eighteen days between February and March 2022. It premiered at the 2022 Toronto International Film Festival on September 8, and was released on The Roku Channel on November 4, 2022. The film received positive reviews from critics, who largely praised its screenplay, humor, and cast performances (particularly Radcliffe).

At the 75th Primetime Emmy Awards, Yankovic and Appel's script was nominated for Outstanding Writing for a Limited or Anthology Series or Movie and Radcliffe's performance was nominated for Outstanding Lead Actor in a Limited or Anthology Series or Movie. The film won the Primetime Emmy Award for Outstanding Television Movie.

== Plot ==
Young Alfred "Al" Yankovic becomes interested in parodying songs despite his father's disapproval. Al's mother secretly purchases an accordion for him, but his father destroys it when Al is caught at an illicit polka party, thus straining Al's relationship with his parents.

Years later, an older Al is living with his roommates Steve, Jim, and Bermuda, and is constantly rejected in band auditions as an accordion player. While listening to "My Sharona" on the radio and fixing a bologna sandwich, Al is inspired to write "My Bologna". He sends the song to a local radio DJ, who puts it on the air immediately; he then goes to Scotti Brothers Records, where the brothers mock him, but are willing to reconsider if Al gains more experience.

Al performs "I Love Rocky Road" for the first time at a biker bar. His roommates step in to fill out his band and make the performance a success. Al catches the interest of radio host and novelty song connoisseur Dr. Demento, who offers to be his manager while suggesting he go by the stage name "Weird Al". At a party hosted by Dr. Demento, the doctor's rival Wolfman Jack dares Al to prove himself by parodying Queen's "Another One Bites the Dust" with bassist John Deacon present. Al comes up with "Another One Rides the Bus", impressing the celebrities in attendance. Al lands his record contract, and his debut album goes multi-platinum, with the original artists experiencing a "Yankovic bump" in record sales and Al being feted by Oprah Winfrey.

Al calls home, only to find his father is still dismissive of him. Dr. Demento suggests Al try to make his own original song, which he refuses. However, after Dr. Demento gives him guacamole laced with LSD, Al comes up with an original new song, which becomes his next hit, "Eat It". Madonna, in search of the "Yankovic bump", begins a relationship with Al to convince him to parody her song "Like a Virgin", though he insists he now only writes original songs. Dr. Demento and Al's bandmates warn him that Madonna is a bad influence, but they continue their romance. Just before a major show, Al learns that Michael Jackson has taken "Eat It" and parodied it as "Beat It", which angers him since he believes people will assume "Eat It" is a parody of "Beat It". An intoxicated Al suffers a near-fatal car accident and is rushed to the hospital, where he comes up with "Like a Surgeon" after regaining consciousness. He premieres the song at a show that same night, while still heavily injured, but when he is reminded that "Eat It" is the last song for the show, he gets drunk on stage, insults the crowd, and is arrested for lewdness.

Once released, Al confesses to Madonna that he fears he has alienated everybody who cared about him and that she is the only one he has left. Suddenly, Madonna is captured by agents of Pablo Escobar, who is a huge fan of Al and uses the kidnapping to coerce him to play at his 40th birthday party. Al flies to Colombia and goes on a rampage to break into Escobar's compound, where he confronts the drug lord. After refusing to play a song for him, he gets into a shootout and kills Escobar and his mercenaries to free Madonna. With the kingpin dead, Madonna tries to talk Al into giving up music and helping her take over Escobar's drug empire, but Al rejects her.

Al returns home to work in his father's factory, as his father had always wanted; but Al's father admits that Al never belonged in that line of work and that he had secretly supported Al's chosen path all along. The elder Yankovic reveals he grew up in an Amish community and was excommunicated for taking up the accordion, prompting him to prevent Al from making the same mistake. Al then brings his father's song, "Amish Paradise", to the stage, winning him a major award in 1985 before being assassinated onstage by one of Madonna's henchmen. Madonna later visits Al's grave before being grabbed by his undead arm.

== Cast ==
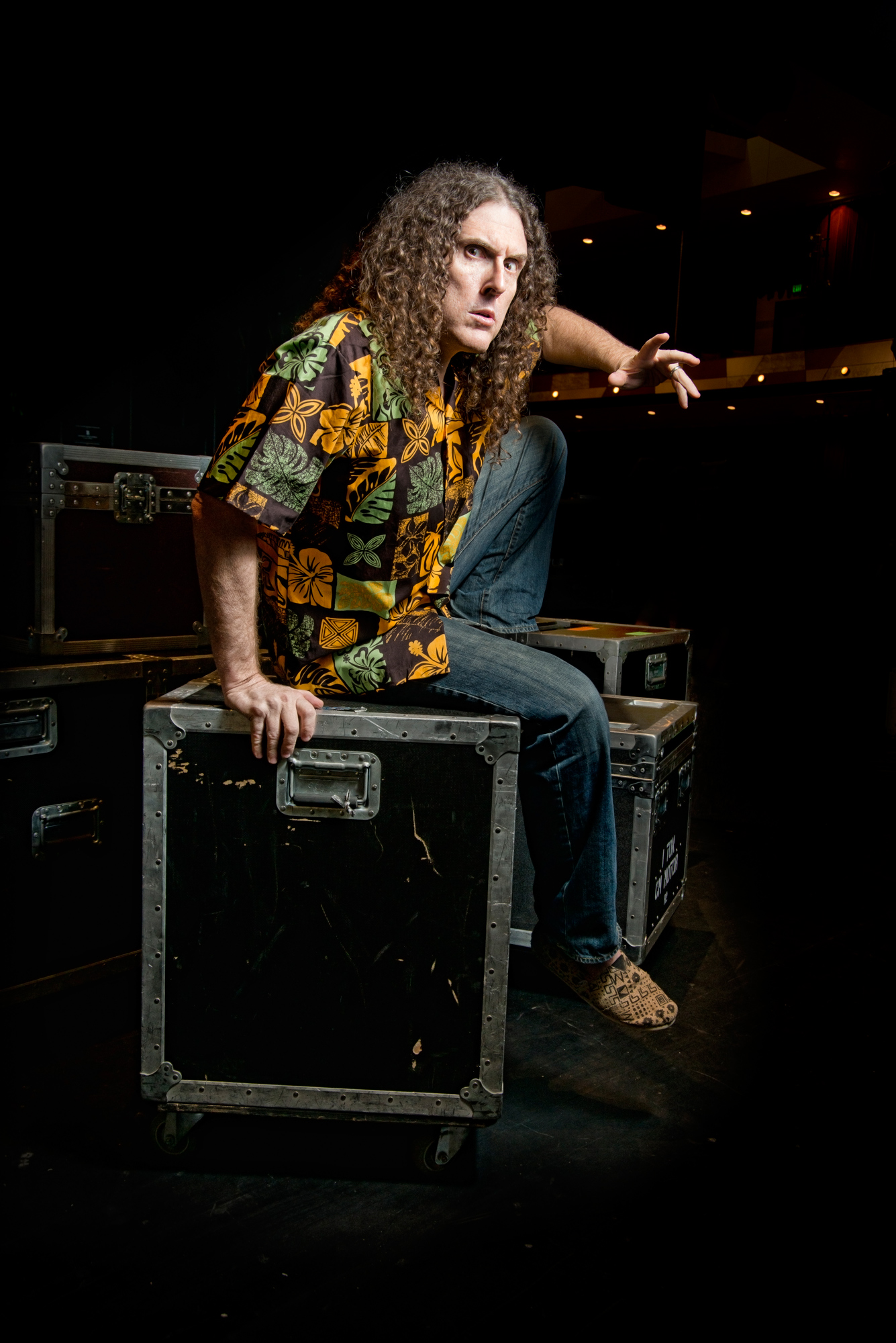
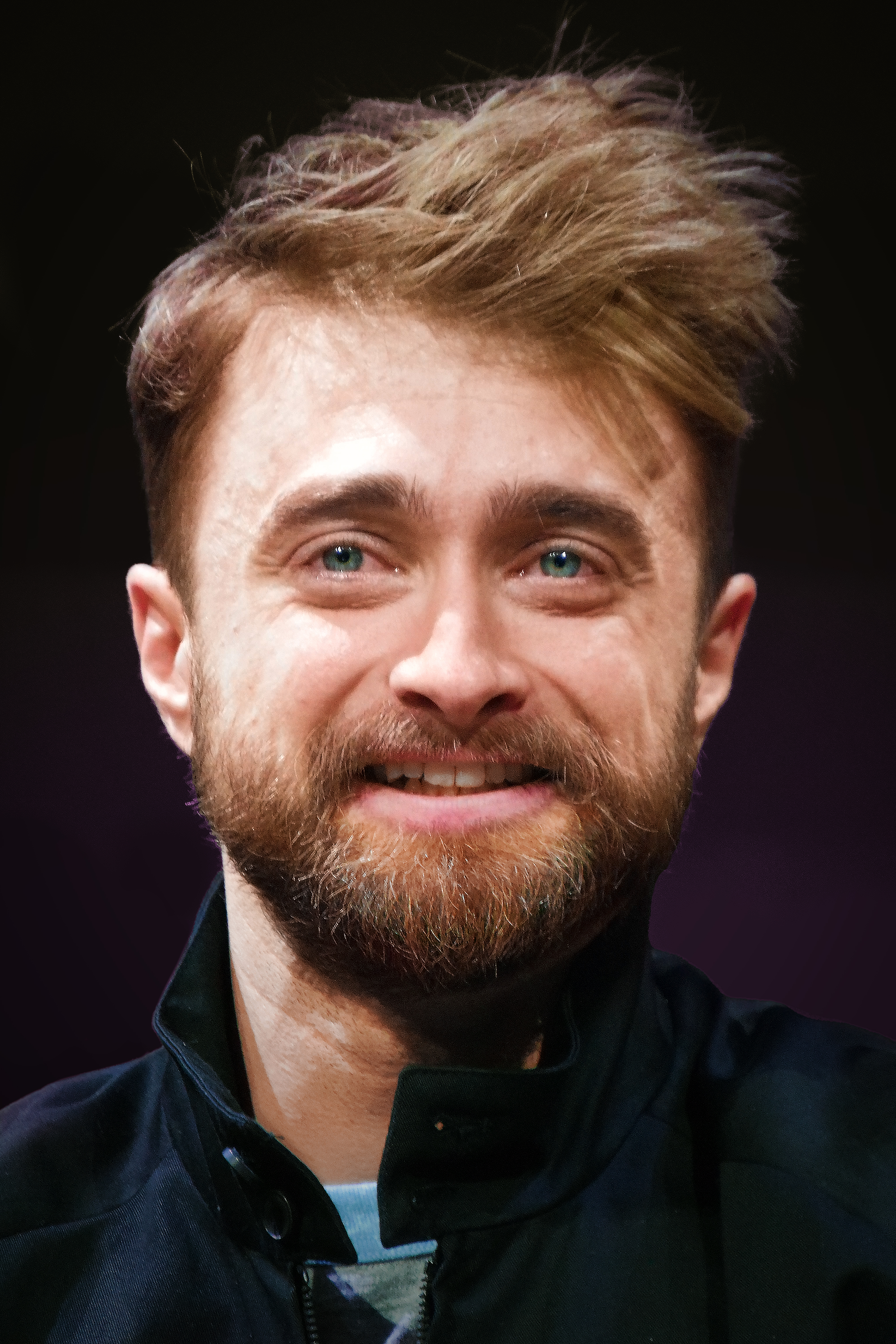
"Weird Al" Yankovic (left), who also appears in the film, is portrayed by Daniel Radcliffe (right).
- Daniel Radcliffe as Alfred "Weird Al" Yankovic
  - Diedrich Bader as narrator Al
  - David Bloom as teenage Al
  - Richard Aaron Anderson as young Al
- Evan Rachel Wood as Madonna
- Rainn Wilson as Dr. Demento
- Toby Huss as Nick Yankovic, Al's estranged father.
- Julianne Nicholson as Mary Yankovic, Al's estranged mother.
- Spencer Treat Clark as Steve Jay, Al's bassist.
- Jack Lancaster as Jim "Kimo" West, Al's lead guitarist.
- Tommy O'Brien as Jon "Bermuda" Schwartz, Al's drummer.
- Thomas Lennon as a traveling accordion salesman.
- Arturo Castro as Pablo Escobar
- Quinta Brunson as Oprah Winfrey
- "Weird Al" Yankovic as Tony Scotti
  - Yankovic also provides onscreen Al's singing voice
- Will Forte as Ben Scotti
- Jack Black as Wolfman Jack
- Lin-Manuel Miranda as the ER doctor
- Scott Aukerman as a police officer
- Dot-Marie Jones as Mama Bear, the owner of the biker bar where Al plays his first gig

The pool party scene features many cameos, including Conan O'Brien as Andy Warhol; Jorma Taccone as Pee-wee Herman; Nina West as Divine; Akiva Schaffer as Alice Cooper; David Dastmalchian as John Deacon; Paul F. Tompkins as Gallagher; Demetri Martin as Tiny Tim; and Emo Philips as Salvador Dalí. In the bar scene, Patton Oswalt plays a heckler, while Michael McKean appears as the MC. Josh Groban plays a waiter, while Seth Green voices a radio DJ. Yankovic's real-life wife Suzanne appears uncredited as Tony's wife Sylvie Vartan.

== Production ==
=== Development ===
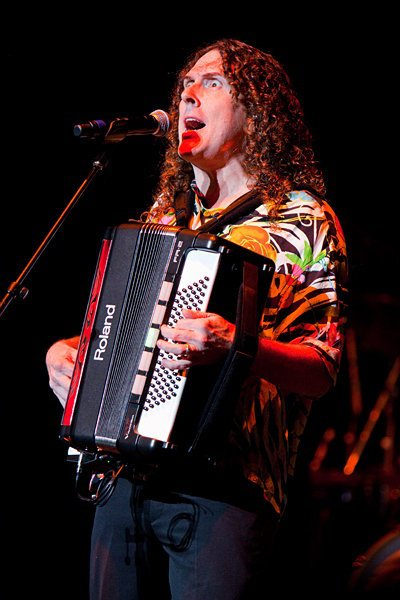
"Weird Al" Yankovic co-wrote the screenplay to the film with Eric Appel.

In 2010, Funny or Die released a fake trailer for a satirical biographical film titled Weird: The Al Yankovic Story directed by Eric Appel and starring Aaron Paul as musician "Weird Al" Yankovic. Additional co-stars in the three-minute-long trailer included Olivia Wilde as Madonna, Gary Cole and Mary Steenburgen as Yankovic's parents, and Patton Oswalt as Dr. Demento. Yankovic himself cameoed as a record producer. At the time, the fake trailer was intended to parody prior biographical films on musicians, such as Ray (2004) and Walk the Line (2005).

Yankovic would play the trailer on his concert tours leading some fans to think it was for a real feature film or encourage him to adapt it into one. On the heels of other successful musician biopics including Bohemian Rhapsody (2018) and Rocketman (2019), Yankovic began to legitimately consider the idea of making a full-length film. He and Appel began to shop the idea around Hollywood, but the studios' initial impressions were that the film was going to be in the vein of a Zucker, Abrahams and Zucker full-on parody and passed on the idea. The two looked at common tropes in other musician biopics, realizing that facts about the musician's life were often changed arbitrarily, and used a similar approach to writing Yankovic's biographical story with the same type of creative freedom. They opted to retain the setting of the film within Yankovic's early career between 1979 and 1985, only going off this period for the inclusion of "Amish Paradise" from 1996 at the end of the film. Some events in the film are based on facts from Yankovic's life: he did receive his first accordion from a traveling salesman; his mother had disapproved of him listening to The Dr. Demento Show; "My Bologna" was recorded in a public bathroom, though in real life, this was a bathroom across from the KCPR radio station offices; there has been a "Yankovic effect" in that being parodied by Yankovic helped boost the success of the original songs by other musicians, notably with Nirvana and Yankovic's parody "Smells Like Nirvana"; and Madonna did originally come up with the concept of Yankovic's parody "Like a Surgeon", which Yankovic had heard about and agreed was a good idea.

A feature film of the same name was officially announced in January 2022, with Daniel Radcliffe set to star in the titular role. It was directed by Appel from a screenplay he co-wrote with Yankovic. Appel jokingly stated, "When Weird Al first sat me down against my will and told me his life story, I didn't believe any of it, but I knew that we had to make a movie about it."

=== Casting ===
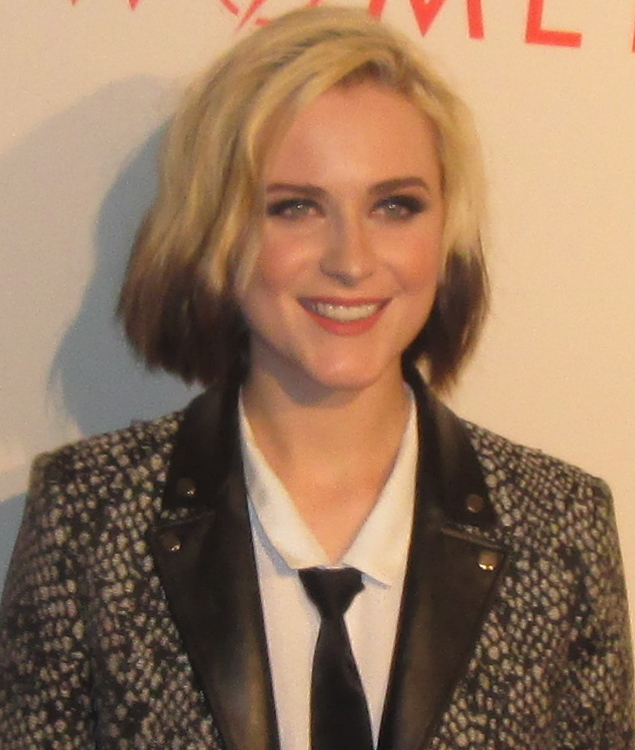
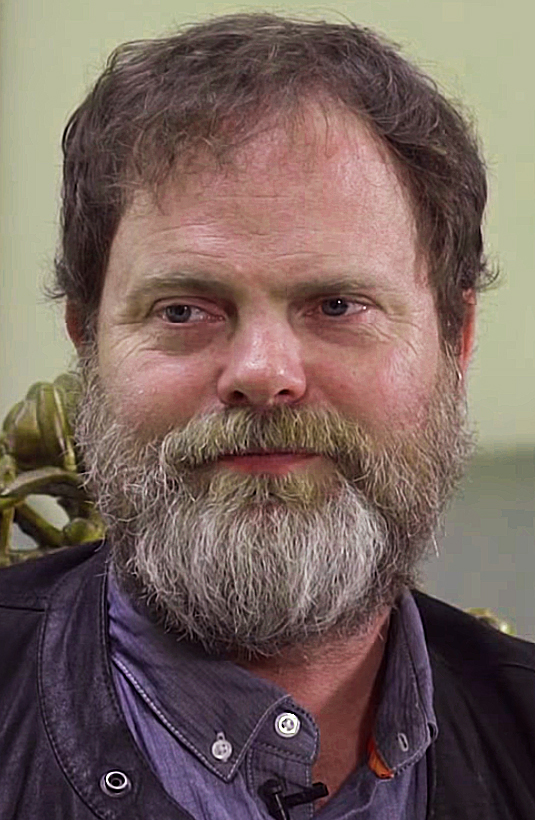
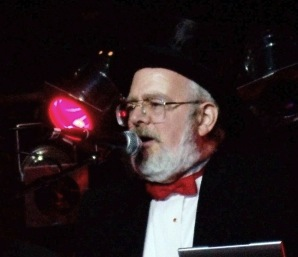
Evan Rachel Wood (top left) was cast as Madonna. Rainn Wilson (top right) portrayed Dr. Demento (bottom), after original cast member Patton Oswalt, who was set to play him, pulled out of the production a few days before filming after breaking his foot.

Yankovic and Appel were aware that Radcliffe was a fan of classic comedic musicians such as Tom Lehrer; for his part, Radcliffe felt that his November 2010 appearance on The Graham Norton Show, during which he sang a rendition of Lehrer's song "The Elements", was the reason for his casting: "I guess Al saw that and was like, 'This guy maybe gets it.' And so he picked me." The actor was already a fan of Yankovic's work through his own appreciation as well as that of his girlfriend, Erin Darke, who would play Yankovic's music on road trips. He was also looking to expand his repertoire, believing the part gave him more creative capabilities similar to his role in Swiss Army Man (2016).

As part of his preparation, Radcliffe learned the principles of playing the accordion, Yankovic's signature instrument, through video tutorials Yankovic had made for him. Radcliffe sang the songs live on camera while filming, but his vocals were replaced with pre-recorded ones by Yankovic in the final product. Yankovic and Appel would later express some regret over not letting Radcliffe perform his own vocals, given Radcliffe's Broadway background, but ultimately felt that having Radcliffe lip-sync to Yankovic's real voice was integral to the biopic parody, as it was the method used with Rami Malek and his Freddie Mercury portrayal in Bohemian Rhapsody.

In March 2022, Evan Rachel Wood, Rainn Wilson, Toby Huss, and Julianne Nicholson were confirmed to star. A few months later in July, it was revealed Quinta Brunson would also appear in the film. Even though Weird is a parody, the filmmakers sought to cast actors known primarily for dramatic roles. Appel believed the humor would then come from the actors playing their roles in a serious, grounded manner, as if they were in a dramatic biopic, despite the absurdity of the scenes.

Yankovic reached out to his "holiday card mailing list" to bring a number of celebrities to cameo in the film, most shown during the Dr. Demento pool party scene. While the script called for Al to be challenged by Freddie Mercury at the pool party, terms of Yankovic's agreement with the band Queen for "Another One Rides the Bus" said that Yankovic could not mention Mercury. They reached out to The Lonely Island (Andy Samberg, Akiva Schaffer, and Jorma Taccone) to appear as the other members of Queen instead, but while Samberg was unavailable, Schaffer and Taccone still wanted to participate in the film, and were cast as Alice Cooper and Pee-wee Herman, respectively. David Dastmalchian was eventually cast as bassist John Deacon. Lin-Manuel Miranda contacted Yankovic within minutes of the announcement of the film's production, requesting a role in it, and Yankovic was able to fit his cameo as an ER doctor during a time when Miranda was in Los Angeles.

Patton Oswalt, who played Dr. Demento in the original short, had been set to play this role in the film, but he broke his foot shortly before shooting began, and due to the tight schedule, the production could not afford to wait. They were able to bring in Wilson to play the role three days before filming commenced. Oswalt was still able to cameo in the film as a heckler in a bar. Aaron Paul, who played Yankovic in the original short, had been set to cameo as the said bar heckler, but he came down with COVID-19 during the filming period and was unable to participate.

=== Filming ===
Once Radcliffe signed on to star, The Roku Channel agreed to invest in Weird. The film had a budget of around $8 million and was shot over eighteen days, after initially being planned for twenty-two days. Filming was limited to eighteen days as part of Roku's contract due to a combination of cost-saving measures and the ongoing COVID-19 pandemic. Principal photography was originally planned to take place in Atlanta to take advantage of tax breaks, but Roku allowed the film to be shot in Los Angeles, which enabled Yankovic and Appel to hire a number of celebrities for cameo appearances in the film. Filming began on February 10, 2022. Radcliffe concluded shooting his scenes after sixteen days on March 4, in Pomona, California. The pool party scene was shot in Tarzana, California. Overall filming wrapped on March 8, 2022. Post-production was done while Yankovic was on The Unfortunate Return of the Ridiculously Self-Indulgent, Ill-Advised Vanity Tour in 2022, with Yankovic working remotely with Appel's team to finalize the film.

Yankovic had the original 16mm footage shot for the "Eat It" video scanned in 4K and this footage was briefly used in the film with Radcliffe's face digitally superimposed onto Yankovic's. Yankovic later edited the newly-scanned footage to match the original video frame-for frame and released it on YouTube.

=== Cultural references ===
Dr. Demento's pool party draws inspiration from a similar scene in the film Boogie Nights (1997), while Al being arrested onstage is based on the 1969 incident with The Doors frontman Jim Morrison during a concert in Miami. The end-credits scene includes a parody of Carrie (1976), in which Madonna comes to visit Al's grave, only to be grabbed at the wrist by a zombified arm.

=== Music ===
Weird: The Al Yankovic Story (Original Soundtrack) is the soundtrack album accompanying the film. Yankovic released it digitally the same day of the film's release, on November 4, 2022. The album includes an original song recorded by Yankovic for the film, "Now You Know", several of his parodies featured in the film with new recorded versions, and the soundtrack compositions by Leo Birenberg and Zach Robinson. It was released on CD on January 27, 2023, followed by a release on vinyl on May 19, 2023.

== Release ==
Weird: The Al Yankovic Story had its world premiere at the Royal Alexandra Theatre during the Toronto International Film Festival on September 8, 2022, and was released on The Roku Channel on November 4, 2022. Yankovic requested that the film have a limited release in theaters to make it eligible for the 95th Academy Awards; Roku declined, preferring for the film to be instead eligible for the 75th Primetime Emmy Awards.

Village Roadshow Entertainment Group acquired the rights to distribute the film in all international markets excluding Canada, Latin America, the United Kingdom, and the United States.

Australian distributor Umbrella Entertainment announced a release on DVD, Blu-ray and 4K Ultra HD, with a release date in April 2023.

In August 2023, Shout! Studios announced a release on DVD, Blu-ray and 4K Ultra HD in the United States and Canada with a release date of December 12, 2023.

== Reception ==
=== Critical response ===
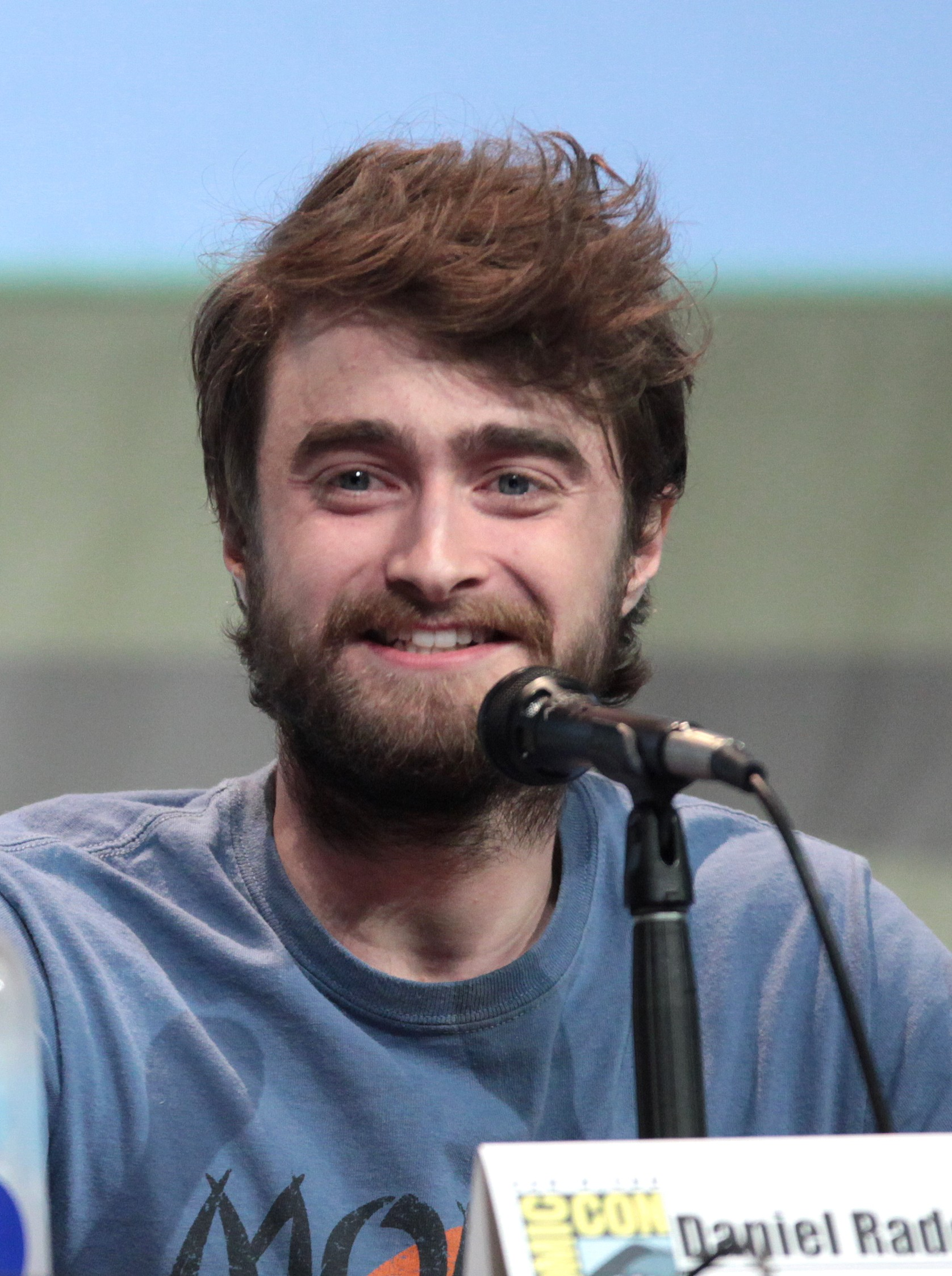
Daniel Radcliffe received critical acclaim for his performance as "Weird Al" Yankovic.

On the review aggregator website Rotten Tomatoes, the film holds an approval rating of 84% based on 160 reviews, with an average of 7.2/10. The website's consensus reads, "Suitably silly, Weird: The Al Yankovic Story spoofs the standard biopic formula with all the good-natured abandon fans will expect." Metacritic assigned the film a weighted average score of 70 out of 100 based on 41 critics, indicating "generally favorable reviews".

Owen Gleiberman of Variety reviewed, "Weird is witty and inventive enough to sustain what could, in lesser hands, have been a one-joke movie, an SNL riff on itself. The film's ultimate joke is that 'Weird Al' Yankovic's entire career was a joke — not just because he made so-daft-they're-funny versions of other people's songs, but because what he did made him a court jester of imitation." Leah Greenblatt of Entertainment Weekly gave the film a grade of B, writing that the film is "an alternative-facts fever dream so bent on the certifiably ridiculous that it circles back around somehow to sweetness. You don't need any of it, really, but as far as celebrity hagiographies go, you kind of can't beat it." Nick Allen of RogerEbert.com gave the film 3.5 stars out of 4 and praised Radcliffe's performance as Yankovic.

Reviewer Amy Nicholson, writing in the New York Times called the film an "uproarious sham biopic" and praised Radcliffe as "winningly guileless in his performance, twitching his costume-y eyebrows and mustache like gentle bunny ears even as he lip-syncs 'Another One Rides the Bus' with such commitment that his neck veins nearly pop." Kellen Quigley of the Salamanca Press compared the film favorably to the 2007 parody biopic Walk Hard: The Dewey Cox Story, noting that both films had come shortly after a wave of Oscar bait biopics. Rafael Motamayor at IGN gave it 9 out of 10 and called it "amazing".

=== Accolades ===
Award	Date of ceremony	Category	Recipient(s)	Result	Ref.
Artios Awards	March 7, 2024	Outstanding Achievement in Casting – Film, Non-Theatrical Release	Wendy O'Brien, Laura Aughton	Nominated	
Astra Creative Arts TV Awards	January 8, 2024	Best Casting in a Limited Series or TV Movie	Weird: The Al Yankovic Story	Won	
Astra Creative Arts TV Awards	January 8, 2024	Best Original Song	"Now You Know"	Nominated	
Astra TV Awards	January 8, 2024	Best Streaming Movie	Weird: The Al Yankovic Story	Won	
Astra TV Awards	January 8, 2024	Best Actor in a Streaming Limited or Anthology Series or Movie	Daniel Radcliffe	Nominated	
Astra TV Awards	January 8, 2024	Best Supporting Actor in a Streaming Limited or Anthology Series or Movie	Rainn Wilson	Nominated	
Astra TV Awards	January 8, 2024	Best Supporting Actress in a Streaming Limited or Anthology Series or Movie	Evan Rachel Wood	Nominated	
Astra TV Awards	January 8, 2024	Best Directing in a Streaming Limited or Anthology Series or Movie	Eric Appel	Nominated	
Astra TV Awards	January 8, 2024	Best Writing in a Streaming Limited or Anthology Series or Movie	Al Yankovic and Eric Appel	Won	
British Academy Television Awards	May 14, 2023	Best Male Comedy Performance	Daniel Radcliffe	Nominated	
Cinema Audio Society Awards	March 2, 2024	Outstanding Achievement in Sound Mixing for Non-Theatrical Motion Pictures or Limited Series	Richard Bullock, Tony Solis, Phil McGowan, Brian Magrum, Erika Koski	Won	
Critics' Choice Television Awards	January 15, 2023	Best Movie Made for Television	Weird: The Al Yankovic Story	Won	
Critics' Choice Television Awards	January 15, 2023	Best Actor in a Limited Series or Movie Made for Television	Daniel Radcliffe	Won	
Directors Guild of America Awards	February 18, 2023	Outstanding Directing – Miniseries or TV Film	Eric Appel	Nominated	
Eddie Awards	March 5, 2023	Best Edited Feature Film (Non-Theatrical)	Jamie Kennedy	Won	
Golden Reel Awards	February 26, 2023	Outstanding Achievement in Sound Editing – Non-Theatrical Feature	Anthony Vanchure, Mike James Gallagher, Sanaa Kelley, Iris Dutour, Luke Kelley	Nominated	
Grammy Awards	February 4, 2024	Best Compilation Soundtrack for Visual Media	Weird: The Al Yankovic Story	Nominated	
Hollywood Music in Media Awards	November 16, 2022	Best Music Themed Film, Biopic or Musical	Weird: The Al Yankovic Story	Nominated	
Hollywood Music in Media Awards	November 16, 2022	Best Original Score – Streamed Live Action Film (No Theatrical Release)	Leo Birenberg and Zach Robinson	Nominated	
Hollywood Music in Media Awards	November 16, 2022	Best Original Song – Streamed Film (No Theatrical Release)	Weird Al Yankovic (for "Now You Know")	Won	
Primetime Emmy Awards	January 15, 2024	Outstanding Lead Actor in a Limited or Anthology Series or Movie	Daniel Radcliffe	Nominated	
Primetime Emmy Awards	January 15, 2024	Outstanding Writing for a Limited or Anthology Series or Movie	Al Yankovic and Eric Appel	Nominated	
Primetime Creative Arts Emmy Awards	January 6–7, 2024	Outstanding Television Movie	Henry R. Munoz III, Neil Shah, Zachary Halley, Mike Farah, Joe Farrell, Whitney Hodack, Tim Headington, Lia Buman, Max Silva, Al Yankovic and Eric Appel	Won	
Primetime Creative Arts Emmy Awards	January 6–7, 2024	Outstanding Casting for a Limited or Anthology Series or Movie	Wendy O'Brien	Nominated	
Primetime Creative Arts Emmy Awards	January 6–7, 2024	Outstanding Picture Editing for a Limited or Anthology Series or Movie	Jamie Kennedy	Nominated	
Primetime Creative Arts Emmy Awards	January 6–7, 2024	Outstanding Music Composition for a Limited or Anthology Series or Movie	Leo Birenberg and Zach Robinson	Won	
Primetime Creative Arts Emmy Awards	January 6–7, 2024	Outstanding Original Music and Lyrics	Al Yankovic (for "Now You Know")	Nominated	
Primetime Creative Arts Emmy Awards	January 6–7, 2024	Outstanding Sound Mixing for a Limited or Anthology Series or Movie	Tony Solis, Richard Bulloock, Brian Magrum, Phil McGowan	Nominated	
Producers Guild of America Awards	February 25, 2023	Outstanding Producer of Streamed or Televised Motion Pictures	Weird: The Al Yankovic Story	Won	
San Diego Film Critics Society	January 6, 2023	Best Comedic Performance	Daniel Radcliffe	Won	
San Diego Film Critics Society	January 6, 2023	Best Use of Music	Weird: The Al Yankovic Story	Nominated	
Satellite Awards	February 11, 2023	Best Motion Picture Made for Television	Weird: The Al Yankovic Story	Won	
Satellite Awards	February 11, 2023	Best Actress in a Supporting Role in a Series, Miniseries, Limited Series, or Motion Picture Made for Television	Evan Rachel Wood	Nominated	
Society of Composers & Lyricists	February 15, 2023	Outstanding Original Score for an Independent Film	Leo Birenberg and Zach Robinson	Nominated	
Society of Composers & Lyricists	February 15, 2023	Outstanding Original Song for a Comedy or Musical Visual Media Production	Al Yankovic (for "Now You Know")	Nominated	
St. Louis Gateway Film Critics Association	December 18, 2022	Best Comedy Film	Weird: The Al Yankovic Story	Won	
St. Louis Gateway Film Critics Association	December 18, 2022	Best Soundtrack	Weird: The Al Yankovic Story	Nominated	
Television Critics Association Awards	August 7, 2023	Outstanding Achievement in Movies, Miniseries or Specials	Weird: The Al Yankovic Story	Nominated	
Toronto International Film Festival	September 18, 2022	People's Choice Award for Midnight Madness	Weird: The Al Yankovic Story	Won	
Writers Guild of America Awards	March 5, 2023	TV & New Media Motion Pictures	Al Yankovic & Eric Appel	Nominated	

== Possible sequel ==
In an October 2026 interview, Yankovic said that he and Appel had written a sequel to Weird, with Radcliffe still interested in the lead role, but no studio yet had appeared interested in it.
