= Leo Birenberg =

American composer

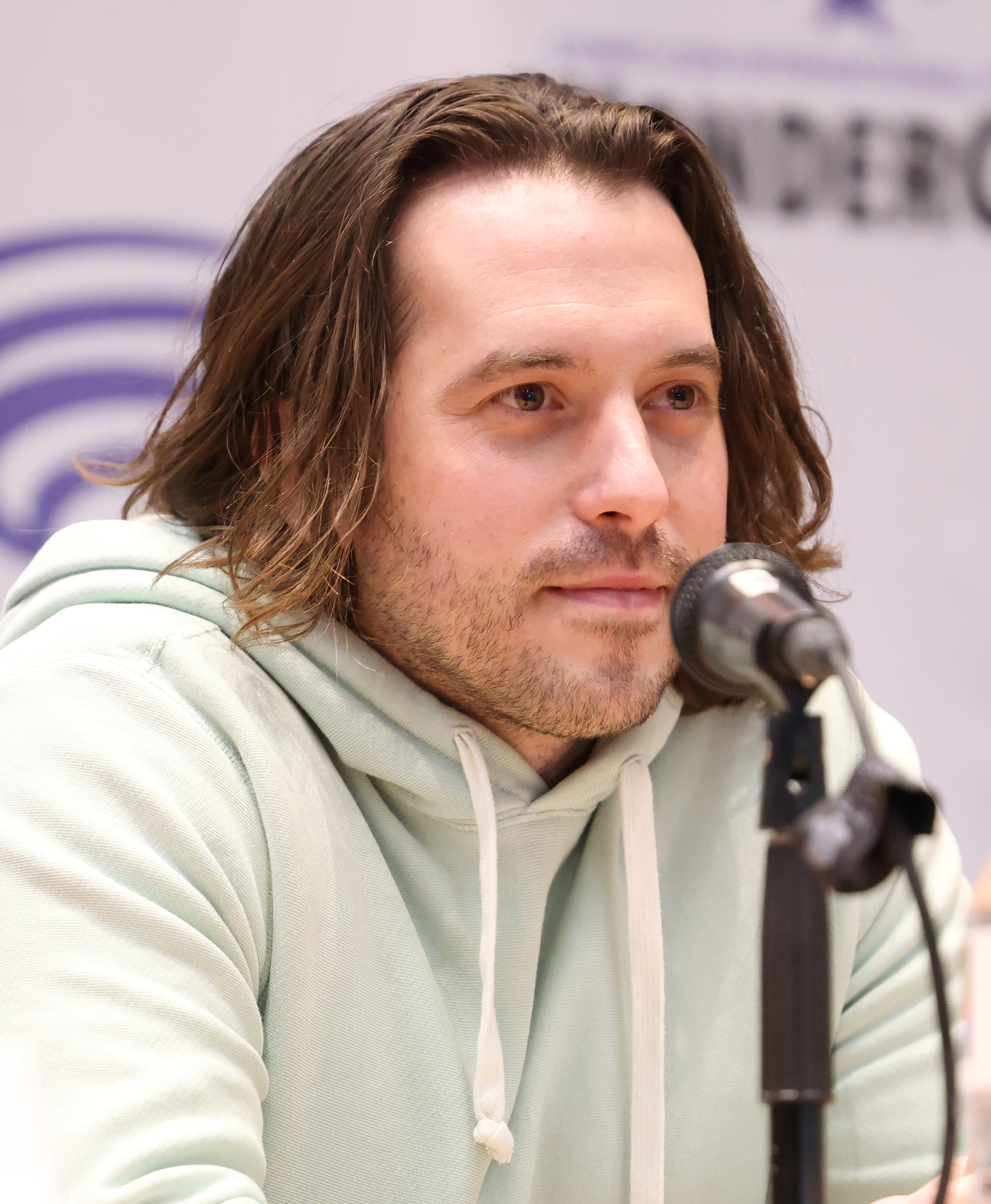
- Birenberg at the 2025 WonderCon

Background information
- Genres: Film and television scores, jazz, experimental, rock, electronica, synth-pop, new-age
- Occupations: Composer, orchestrator
- Instruments: Piano, keyboards, synthesizer, guitar
- Years active: 2001–present
- Website: https://leobirenberg.com

Leo Birenberg is an American composer and orchestrator for film and television.

== Career ==
Born in Kentucky and raised in Chicago, Birenberg studied composition at NYU and USC. While there, he started composing his first scores in collaboration with his roommate, filmmaker Jeremy Reitz. His favorite score is from Out of Africa.

After graduating, he had a chance encounter with composer Christophe Beck, who ended up taking Birenberg on as a mentee. Under Beck's tutelage, Birenberg worked as the score coordinator on numerous large projects, including The Muppets, Pitch Perfect, Runner Runner, and Frozen. In 2014, Birenberg started composing additional music for Beck's films, including Muppets Most Wanted, Edge of Tomorrow, and Ant-Man.

In 2014, Birenberg also started composing his own original scores for television shows, including Next Time on Lonny, The Britishes, Big Time in Hollywood, FL, and the YouTube Red series Sing It!

In 2016, Birenberg received an email from producer Eric Appel, and asked to compose music for the then-upcoming FX series Son of Zorn. Upon approaching the series, he took the original up-beat synth-heavy score and replaced it with something that spanned a vast array of musical styles, sampling the styles of country music and church choirs. In 2017, Birenberg released a soundtrack for the show. That same year, Birenberg also started composing music for the Seeso original series Take My Wife. He also composed the score for the 2017 comedy F the Prom.

In 2018, Birenberg co-composed YouTube and Sony series Cobra Kai with composer Zach Robinson. They also scored the subsequent seasons through to season six. In addition, he scored the music for the DreamWorks Animation Television series Kung Fu Panda: The Paws of Destiny, Jurassic World Camp Cretaceous and Jurassic World: Chaos Theory.

In 2019, Leo composed the music for Hulu's Pen15. He also recently scored Adult Swim's animated series Tigtone, Tribeca Film Festival selection Plus One, the Peacock series Twisted Metal, the Marvel Studios Animation series Your Friendly Neighborhood Spider-Man, and the 2026 comedy film The Breadwinner.

== Awards and honors ==
Birenberg's score with Zach Robinson for Weird: The Al Yankovic Story won the 2023 Primetime Emmy for Outstanding Music Composition for a Limited or Anthology Series, Movie or Special (Original Dramatic Score). The duo also gained the following nominations:

- Best Compilation Soundtrack for Visual Media at the 2024 Grammys
- Best Score - Streamed Live Action Film in the 2022 Hollywood Music in Media
- Outstanding Original Score for an Independent Film at the 4th SCL Awards.

Their music for Cobra Kai has had the following nominations:

- ASCAP's Composer's Choice Award for the Television Score of the Year category in 2021
- ASCAP's Composer's Choice Award for the Television Score of the Year category in 2023.
- IFMCA's Best Original Score for Television in 2025.

== Filmography ==
=== Films ===
Year	Title	Notes
2026	Street Fighter	Composer with Zach Robinson
2026	Super Troopers 3	Composer with Zach Robinson
2026	Pizza Movie	Composer with Zach Robinson
2026	The Breadwinner	Composer with Zach Robinson
2024	How to Rob a Bank	Composer
2024	Die Hart: Die Harter	Composer with Zach Robinson
2023	Bottoms	Composer with Charli XCX
2022	Weird: The Al Yankovic Story	Composer with Zach Robinson
2022	Butcher's Crossing	Composer
2022	Mack & Rita	Composer
2022	Anything's Possible	Composer
2022	Unplugging	Composer
2020	Impractical Jokers: The Movie	Composer with Zach Robinson
2020	Secret Society of Second Born Royals	Composer
2019	Red Penguins	Composer
2019	Plus One	Composer
2017	F the Prom	Composer with Zach Robinson
2015	The Peanuts Movie	Composer (additional music)
2015	Ant-Man	Composer (additional music)
2015	Hot Tub Time Machine 2	Composer (additional music), Orchestrator
2014	Good Kill	Composer (additional music)
2014	Alexander and the Terrible, Horrible, No Good, Very Bad Day	Score Producer
2014	Red Army	Composer
2014	Edge of Tomorrow	Composer (additional music)
2014	Muppets Most Wanted	Composer (additional music)
2014	Endless Love	Composer (additional music), Score Producer
2013	Frozen	Score Coordinator
2013	Runner Runner	Score Coordinator
2013	R.I.P.D.	Score Coordinator
2013	The Internship	Score Coordinator
2013	The Hangover Part III	Score Coordinator
2013	Movie 43	Composer (segment: "Happy Birthday")
2013	Charlie Countryman	Score Coordinator
2012	Struck By Lightning	Score Coordinator
2012	The Guilt Trip	Score Coordinator
2012	Pitch Perfect	Music Assistant
2012	The Watch	Score Coordinator
2012	This Means War	Score Coordinator
2011	The Muppets	Score Coordinator
2011	Tower Heist	Score Coordinator

=== Television ===
Year	Title	Notes
2025–present	The Sisters Grimm	Composer (12 episodes)
2025–present	Your Friendly Neighborhood Spider-Man	Composer with Zach Robinson (10 episodes)
2024–2025	Jurassic World: Chaos Theory	Composer; Original Jurassic Park themes by John Williams (39 episodes)
2023–present	Twisted Metal	Composer with Zach Robinson (10 episodes)
2023	Obliterated	Composer with Zach Robinson (8 episodes)
2023	Florida Man	Composer with Zach Robinson (7 episodes)
2022	Pitch Perfect: Bumper in Berlin	Composer with Zach Robinson (6 episodes)
2022–2023	Interrupting Chicken	Composer (17 episodes)
2022	The Boys Presents: Diabolical	Composer (TV mini series, 1 episode)
2020–2023	Die Hart	Composer with Leo Birenberg (18 episodes)
2020–2022	Jurassic World Camp Cretaceous	Composer; Original Jurassic Park and Jurassic World themes by John Williams and Michael Giacchino (50 episodes)
2020–2021	Central Park	Composer (12 episodes)
2020	Helter Skelter: An American Myth	Composer (TV mini series, 6 episodes)
2019–2021	PEN15	Composer (24 episodes)
2019–2020	Tigtone	Composer (20 episodes)
2018–2019	Kung Fu Panda: The Paws of Destiny	Composer (26 episodes)
2018–2025	Cobra Kai	Composer with Zach Robinson (65 episodes)
2018	In Search of Greatness	Composer
2016–2018	Adam Ruins Everything	Composer (7 episodes)
2016	Take My Wife	Composer (7 episodes)
2016	Son of Zorn	Composer (13 episodes)
2016	A Classy Broad	Composer
2016	Sing It!	Composer with Zach Robinson (10 episodes)
2015	Big Time in Hollywood, FL	Composer (12 episodes)
2014	The Britishes	Composer
2014	Next Time on Lonny	Composer (10 episodes)
2014	30 for 30: Soccer Stories	Composer (1 episode)
2012	The Kindly Midwesterner	Composer (TV mini series, 8 episodes)
2011–2013	Dropout	Composer (18 episodes)

=== Shorts ===
Year	Title	Notes
2023	Every Part of You	Composer
2023	One Night With Love	Composer
2020	Pretty People	Composer
2016	Remember This Voice	Composer
2015	Scatterwild	Composer
2014	Grooming	Composer
2013	After I've Gone	Composer
2013	Three Little Words	Composer
2013	The Desert Son	Composer
2012	Goat Sucker	Composer
2011	Dani and Wayne	Composer
2011	Shock Troop	Composer
2011	Baby Ruth	Composer
2010	The Harbinger	Composer
2010	The Half Man	Composer
2009	Caring Hearts & Caring Hands	Composer
2009	Kouzelnik	Composer

=== Video Games ===
Year	Title	Notes
2022	Cobra Kai 2: Dojos Rising	Composer with Zach Robinson
2020	Cobra Kai: The Karate Kid Saga Continues	Composer with Zach Robinson
