= Zach Robinson (composer) =

American composer and music producer

- Born: U.S.
- Occupations: Composer; music producer

Zach Robinson is an American composer and music producer. He is known for co-composing the score for the Netflix series Cobra Kai and Roku’s film Weird: The Al Yankovic Story, for which he won a Primetime Emmy Award in 2023 for Outstanding Music Composition for a Limited or Anthology Series, Movie or Special (Original Dramatic Score), alongside collaborator Leo Birenberg. The duo were also nominated for a 2024 Grammy Award for Best Compilation Soundtrack for Visual Media for Weird: The Al Yankovic Story and, in 2025, for a Primetime Emmy Award for Outstanding Music Composition for a Series (Original Dramatic Score) for their Cobra Kai score.

== Life and career ==
Robinson earned a degree in music composition from Northwestern University in 2012. After graduating, he worked under the film composer Christophe Beck, contributing additional music to films such as Frozen (2013), Edge of Tomorrow (2014), Ant-Man (2015), Hot Pursuit (2015), and The Peanuts Movie (2015).

Robinson has collaborated with composer Leo Birenberg on several projects. Their notable works include composing the score for the Netflix series Cobra Kai (2018–2025), set in The Karate Kid universe, as well as Weird: The Al Yankovic Story (2022), the Peacock series Twisted Metal (2023), and Marvel's Your Friendly Neighborhood Spider-Man (2025). Independently, he has composed for the CBS series Matlock (2024–2025), the Netflix docu-series America's Sweethearts: Dallas Cowboys Cheerleaders (2024–2025), Wrestlers (2023), Hulu’s Fright Krewe (2023) and more.

== Selected filmography ==
As Composer

=== Television ===
Year	Title	Notes
2016	Sing It!	Composed with Leo Birenberg
2018–2019	Oljefondet	
2022	Good Sam	
2022	Pitch Perfect: Bumper in Berlin	Composed with Leo Birenberg
2022	The Boys Presents: Diabolical	Composed with Leo Birenberg
2020–2023	Die Hart	Composed with Leo Birenberg
2023	Florida Man	Composed with Leo Birenberg
2023	Wrestlers	
2023–2024	Fright Krewe	
2023	Obliterated	Composed with Leo Birenberg
2018–2025	Cobra Kai	Composed with Leo Birenberg
2024–2025	Matlock	
2024–2025	America's Sweethearts: Dallas Cowboys Cheerleaders	
2023–present	Twisted Metal	Composed with Leo Birenberg
2025	The Clubhouse: A Year with the Red Sox	
2025	Your Friendly Neighborhood Spider-Man	Composed with Leo Birenberg

=== Film ===
Year	Title	Notes
2016	F the Prom	Composed with Leo Birenberg
2019	Josie & Jack	
2020	Impractical Jokers: The Movie	Composed with Leo Birenberg
2021	Shelter in Place	
2022	Run & Gun	
2022	Weird: The Al Yankovic Story	Composed with Leo Birenberg
2024	Die Hart: Die Harter	Composed with Leo Birenberg
2026	Pizza Movie	Composed with Leo Birenberg
2026	Super Troopers 3	Composed with Leo Birenberg
2026	Street Fighter	Composed with Leo Birenberg

=== Video Games ===
Year	Title	Notes
2020	Cobra Kai: The Karate Kid Saga Continues	Composed with Leo Birenberg
2022	Cobra Kai 2: Dojos Rising	Composed with Leo Birenberg

== Awards and nominations ==
Year	Result	Award	Category	Work	Ref.
2022	Nominated	International Film Music Critics Award	Best Original Score for Television	Cobra Kai	
2022	Nominated	Hollywood Music in Media Awards	Best Original Score – Streamed Live Action Film (No Theatrical Release)	Weird: The Al Yankovic Story	
2023	Nominated	Society of Composers and Lyricists Awards	Outstanding Original Score for an Independent Film	Weird: The Al Yankovic Story	
2023	Won	Primetime Emmy Awards	Outstanding Music Composition for a Limited or Anthology Series, Movie or Special (Original Dramatic Score)	Weird: The Al Yankovic Story	
2024	Nominated	Grammy Awards	Best Compilation Soundtrack for Visual Media	Weird: The Al Yankovic Story	
2025	Nominated	International Film Music Critics Award	Best Original Score for Television	Cobra Kai	
2025	Nominated	Primetime Emmy Awards	Outstanding Music Composition for a Series (Original Dramatic Score)	Cobra Kai	
