= Willa Schneberg =

American poet (born 1952)

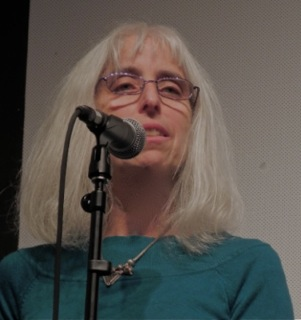
- American poet Willa Schneberg
- Born: May 21, 1952 (age 74); Brooklyn, New York, United States
- Spouse: Robin Bagai
- Writing career
- Notable work: In the Margins of the World
- Notable awards: Stafford/Hall Award for Poetry (Oregon Book Award), 2002

Willa Hope Schneberg (born May 21, 1952, in Brooklyn, New York) is an American poet. She has published five full-length poetry collections, including In The Margins Of The World, winner of the 2002 Oregon Book Award; Box Poems (Alice James Books); Storytelling In Cambodia (Calyx Books); Rending the Garment (Mudfish/Box Turtle Press); and The Naked Room. The letterpress chapbook, The Books of Esther, was produced in conjunction with her interdisciplinary exhibit at the Oregon Jewish Museum and Center for Holocaust Education. The Naked Room was released in 2023. Willa's current project with Jim Lommasson is entitled What We Hold & Leave Behind: Photos of Special Objects and Linked Poems by Senior Seasoned Poets. This project celebrates the lives of over 20 elder poets, including two former Oregon Poet Laureates—Paulann Petersen and Kim Stafford—fellow poet Ingrid Wendt, and Willa Schneberg herself.

== Early life ==
Willa Schneberg was born in East New York (Brooklyn), New York. She was raised in a middle class housing project and attended Thomas Jefferson High School in East New York, the same school that both of her parents graduated from. Her father, Ben Schneberg, was born in Brownsville (Brooklyn) in 1915, and her mother, Esther Schneberg, was born in East New York (Brooklyn) in 1920. Both of her parents were first generation Americans—Ben's parents emigrated from Austria, while Esther's father was from Romania and her mother was from Austria. Ben was a middle school teacher and later became a law librarian, working on Wall Street for Berlack, Israels & Lieberman. For over twenty years Esther was a high school English teacher at Thomas Jefferson High School. She was a substitute teacher when Willa attended, and then later became a full-time English teacher. Esther eventually became the head of College Discovery, an affirmative action program whose aim was to help minority students get into college. Many of her students were the first members of their families to attend college and a number were accepted into Ivy League schools.

== Work and education ==
Willa graduated from Thomas Jefferson High School in 1969. She attended a number of colleges, including Binghamton University, Nova Scotia College of Art and Design, and Empire State College, where she graduated in 1973 with a degree in creative writing and fine art. During her time as an undergraduate student, she studied ceramics at Tulane University in New Orleans and Greenwich House in New York City.

In 1975, Willa moved to the Boston area where she studied ceramics through Boston University's Program in Artisanry for professional crafts people. In 1979, during her time in Cambridge/Somerville, her first collection of poetry, Box Poems, was published by Alice James Books, a non-profit poetry press started by five women and two men, who felt there needed to be a press with an emphasis on publishing literature written by women. Alice James Books marked its 40th anniversary in 2014.

During her time in Massachusetts, Willa also worked as a recreational therapist for Hebrew Rehabilitation Center, a Jewish nursing home in Roslindale, Massachusetts. She helped residents run a letterpress workshop and publish a collection of their original poetry. While at the rehab center, she began to see that art can be an effective form of therapy and to also see how she might use this knowledge in her later career as a psychotherapist.

In 1980, she was an artist-in-residence for the Department of Defense Dependent Schools (DoDDS) at American military bases in the Far East. For six months, she worked in the Philippines, Korea, Japan, and Okinawa, teaching poetry and clay sculpture workshops to students in kindergarten through community college.

After returning to the states in 1980, Willa studied Gestalt therapy at the Esalen Institute in Big Sur, California. And from 1981 to 1983, she attended graduate school at the University of Tennessee, Knoxville, earning a Master of Science in social work (MSSW).

She worked in Zefat, Israel from 1987 to 1988 as part of Sherut La'am (Service to the People), teaching art therapy to both at-risk children and severely developmentally disabled young men. While in Israel, she conducted poetry workshops for English-speaking Israelis. Her collection, In the Margins of the World, was inspired by both her living in Israel and living in Knoxville.

Willa worked for the United Nations Transitional Authority in Phnom Penh, Cambodia from 1992 to 1993. As a District Electoral Supervisor she set up voting registration sites, and later she initiated a new post, Medical Liaison Officer. As the Medical Liaison Officer, she briefed new UN Volunteers on tropical diseases and vaccinations, offered follow-up to United Nations Volunteer tropical disease patients in the field hospital, managed domestic and international emergency medical evacuations, attended to the administrative needs of the UNV physicians stationed in the countryside, and provided counseling to UN personnel. Her collection, Storytelling in Cambodia, is based in large part on her time spent in Cambodia.

In 1993, Willa moved to Portland, Oregon, where she still resides with her husband, Robin Bagai, a psychologist in private practice. Willa worked for the Garlington Center, a community-based nonprofit mental health care center, and then went into (full-time) private practice in 1996.

She is also an interdisciplinary artist who has exhibited her ceramic sculpture and photographs nationally and in literary journals and online magazines. Willa's 2012 show at the Oregon Jewish Museum and Center for Holocaust Education, "The Books of Esther: An interdisciplinary exhibition of the life of one woman who 'talked' through writing," was about her mother, a larynx cancer survivor, who wrote what she would have spoken. Willa utilized ceramic sculpture, photographs, audio clips, and personal objects to reveal how memory, language, Jewish identity, work, disability, and ageing shape a life. "The Books of Esther" embodies the essential contribution of written language, and how one woman's need to communicate trumped her disability.

In 2014, memorabilia, ceramic sculpture, photographs, and broadsides were on display at Glyph Café and Arts Space in Portland, Oregon, relating to her collection, Rending the Garment, published in the same year, a linked-poetry homage to her deceased parents, Ben and Esther.

== Additional publications ==
Willa's poetry has appeared in publications such as The American Poetry Review, Michigan Quarterly Review, Salmagundi, Tikkun,Poet Lore, The Oregonian, and Bellevue Literary Review, Harpur Palate, and Calyx Journal. She has been included in numerous anthologies, including Lit From the Inside: 40 Years of Poetry from Alice James Books, I Go to the Ruined Place: Contemporary Poets in Defense of Global Human Rights, Before There Is Nowhere to Stand: Palestine/Israel Poets Respond to the Struggle from Lost Horse Press, and The Years Best Fantasy and Horror Nineteenth Annual Collection from St. Martin's Press. Her poetry was also featured in the textbook Bearing Witness: Teaching About The Holocaust, which discusses Willa's poetry alongside that of Carolyn Forché and Sharon Olds.

== Awards and recognition ==
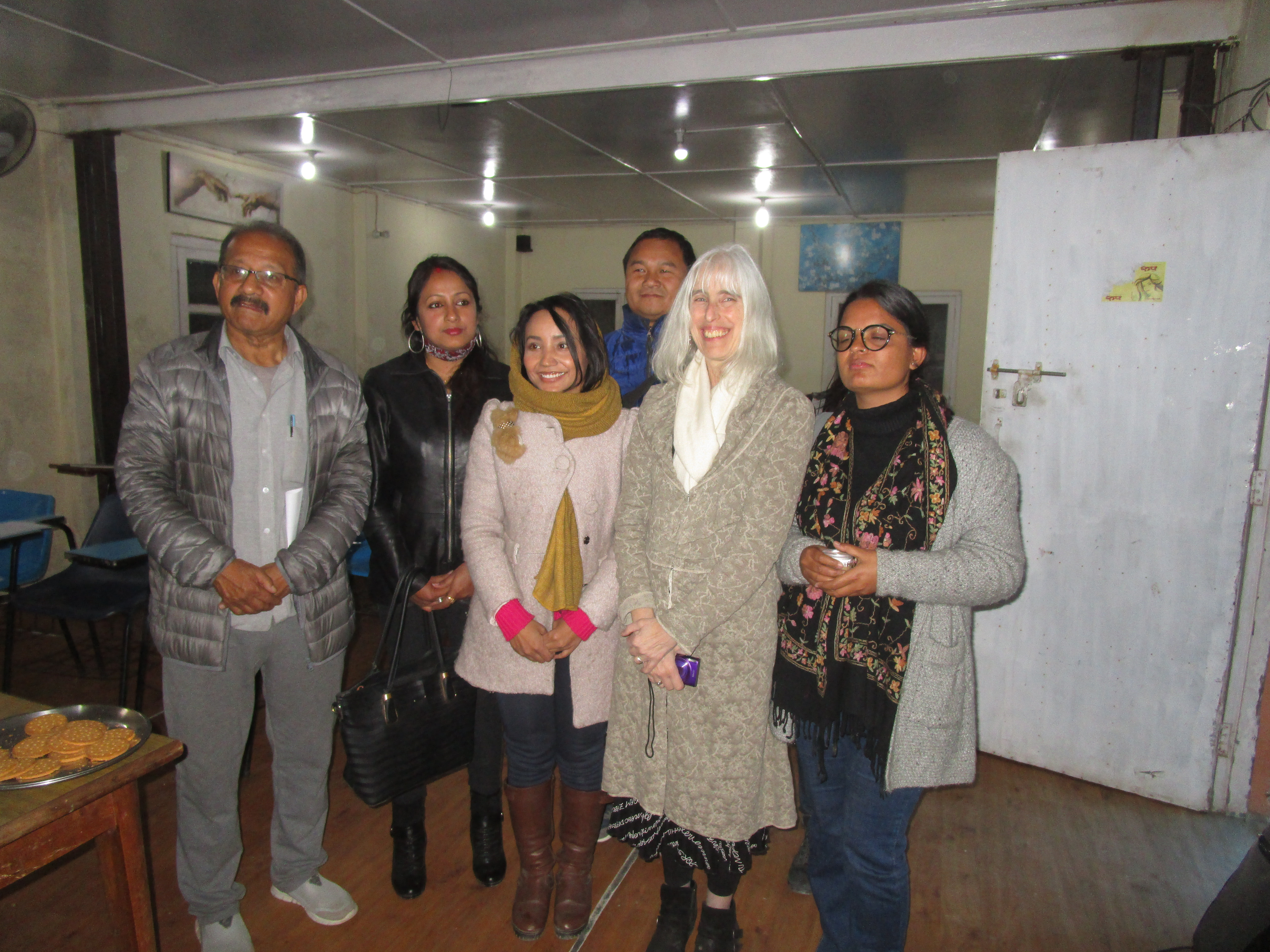
Willa Schneberg and others at Institute of Advanced Communication, Education and Research

Willa's collection In the Margins of the World was awarded the Stafford/Hall Award for Poetry from the Oregon Book Awards in 2002. Two of her poems from In the Margins of the World, "Biscuits" and "Spilled Milk," were read on Garrison Keillor's The Writer's Almanac. She has been awarded two Oregon Literary Arts Fellowships in poetry, a grant from the Money for Women/Barbara Deming Memorial Fund, along with three Professional Development Grants from the Regional Arts & Culture Council (RACC), including a grant for travel to Kathmandu as a poet-in-residence. For ten days in February 2018, Willa presented at the Nepal Academy and the Nepal Academy of Fine Arts (NAFA); Gunjan, a Nepalese women writers' organization; and the Nepalbhasa Council Literary Association. In 2022, she was selected by the Oregon Poet Laureate Selection Committee to be the next Oregon Poet Laureate. However, because of Covid’s persistence, a late decision was made to give the then Poet Laureate a second two-year term. In March 2023, she presented from The Naked Room in Glasgow, Scotland, at the University of Strathclyde and the Royal College of Physicians & Surgeons of Glasgow.In 2024, she was nominated for the Pushcart Prize by the editors of The Poeming Pigeon.

She has also received poetry fellowships at Yaddo, MacDowell, the Helene Wurlitzer Foundation, and the Tyrone Guthrie Centre in Ireland. In the summer of 2015, she was in-residence at the Art Kibbutz on Governor's Island, the only artist colony that exists exclusively for the Jewish artistic community. In 2004 and 2015, Willa judged the Annual Reuben Rose International Poetry Competition, sponsored by Voices Israel. For over twenty years she has curated Oregon Jewish Voices, an annual reading of Oregon Jewish writers at the Oregon Jewish Museum and Center for Holocaust Education, (OJMCHE). And she was the final judge for the 2015 and 2021 Lois Cranston Memorial Poetry Prize offered by Calyx: A Journal of Art and Literature by Women.

Willa has read and conducted workshops at the Portland Book Festival, the Montana Book Festival, Split This Rock, Get Lit!, the Association of Writers & Writing Programs (AWP) conference, and most recently at the Skagit River Poetry Festival. She has read all over the United States at venues including the KGB Bar and the Bowery Poetry Club in New York City; the Library of Congress; Diesel, A Bookstore in Oakland; Magers and Quinn in Minneapolis; and Powell's Books in Portland, among many others.

In 2026, she received Honorable Mention in the Neahkahnie Mountain Poetry Prize sponsored by the Hoffman Center for the Arts.

== Bibliography ==
- Box Poems, Alice James Books, 1979
- In The Margins of the World, Plain View Press, 2001
- Storytelling in Cambodia, Calyx Books, 2006
- The Books of Esther, limited edition letterpress chapbook, Paper Crane Press, 2012
- Rending the Garment, Mudfish/Box Turtle Press, 2014
- The Naked Room, Broadstone Books, 2023

== Reviews and interviews ==
"Willa Schneberg has been writing long enough to know that literary careers aren’t built by accident—they’re built by communities that pay attention… In this conversation, Schneberg reflects on feminist publishing as lineage rather than ladder, on the editors who shaped her work with rigor and care, and on why internationalism, moral clarity, and courage still matter, perhaps more than ever."
—Anaïs Godard, CALYX

"There is a grim and dark compassion to these poems, a willingness to look at the source of unimaginable behavior and treat it with understanding.”
—Brenna Crotty, Calyx: A Journal of Art & Literature

"It is difficult to encapsulate what makes The Naked Room so special, but suffice to say that I have already added excerpts from the book to teach alongside Gilman, Plath, Sexton and others whose legacies are so inextricably entwined with mental illness. Add Schneberg to the list of authors you turn to, in your own crises and in the crises of others.”
—Ronnie K. Stephens, The Poetry Question

"In The Naked Room, Schneberg travels poignant emotional distances. Drawing on her experiences as a psychotherapist, she explores the subtle workings of the mind and considers what happens when the mind is shattered, confused, or in disarray."
—Amy Leona Havin, Oregon ArtsWatch

"Willa Schneberg’s, The Naked Room is an insightful, evocative and often harrowing journey across time and place that depicts how we have tried, and often failed, to come to grips with what it means to be sane in an insane world."
—Matthew Smith, FRJHisS, Professor of Health History, University of Strathclyde, Glasgow; author of The First Resort: The History Of Social Psychiatry in the United States

"Rending the Garment tells a familiar tale: the Jewish immigrant family romance, but with an important difference. Using shifting points of view and narrative interruptions, biographical essays, scolding notes from school principals, diary entries, not to mention a cast of characters as lively as a Borscht Belt revue, Willa Schneberg tells her story from the inside, where grief and love live side by side in bed 'neither old nor young,' bodies outside of time… A fresh, original and moving addition to our literature."
—Philip Schultz, Pulitzer Prize Winner for Failure

Poet Ellen Bass, author of The Human Line, praised Willa Schneberg's poetry collection Rending the Garment for its portrayal of a Jewish immigrant family and its experiences in the United States. Bass highlighted Schneberg's use of Yiddish and English to represent the speech patterns, personalities, and cultural experiences of different generations. She also noted the collection's exploration of family relationships, religious identity, personal contradictions, and the experiences of Jewish immigrants in America.

"Schneberg's poetry is both a quiet reflection on the brevity of life and a celebration of how full it is...From tender adolescence through the indignities of advanced age, Schneberg plays with perspective to broaden the portrait of her family and delivers a robust and bittersweet narrative."
—ForeWord Reviews

"Some books of poetry leave memories of particular images or specific lines; others leave impressions of a certain emotional tone. Rending the Garment leaves me with the remarkable individuals to which it has given voice."
—Eleanor Berry, Oregon Poetry Association
