= Palindromes and Anagrams =

- Author: Howard W. Bergerson
- Language: English
- Published: 1973
- Publisher: Dover Publications
- Publication place: USA
- Media type: Print
- ISBN: 0-486-20664-5

Palindromes and Anagrams is a 1973 non-fiction book on wordplay by Howard W. Bergerson.

== Content ==
Over a third of the book is devoted to the study and collection of anagrams. Of the 1169 anagrams Bergerson lists, most are sourced to the files of the National Puzzlers' League, and some had been previously printed in Dmitri Borgmann's Language on Vacation.

Other sections of the book cover palindromes of various forms, including palindromic poetry by J. A. Lindon, Graham Reynolds, and Bergerson himself. Among these is Bergerson's "Edna Waterfall", a 1039-letter poem which was for some time listed by the Guinness Book of World Records as the longest palindrome in English. Most of Bergerson's other original palindromes are credited not to himself but rather to Edwin Fitzpatrick, a fictitious 19th-century poet. (Bergerson had invented Fitzpatrick some years earlier, though did not openly admit to the hoax until shortly before his book was released. To Bergerson's surprise, his joke had fooled even his publisher.)

Besides the titular forms of wordplay, the book devotes chapters to vocabularyclept poetry (a special form of anagrammatic poetry in which the words of a poem are rearranged into a new poem) and written charades.

== Reception and legacy ==
Palindromes and Anagrams was a modest success when first published, selling over 13,000 copies by 1979. It was favourably reviewed in Word Ways, the journal of recreational linguistics which Bergerson formerly edited; fellow ex-editor Borgmann wrote that the book succeeds in "impart[ing] to palindromes and anagrams a status, a dignity, and a future they have not heretofore possessed", and concluded that it was therefore "a sine qua non for all serious logologists, as well as for all laymen interested in verbal curiosities". The book has since come to be regarded as groundbreaking and influential, and is said to be the greatest and most complete work on palindromes and anagrams up to the time of its publication. It is a particular favourite of comedian Alex Horne, who wrote that as a child it showed him how to "play with language like a toy".

Edwin Fitzpatrick, the fictional Victorian palindromist to whom Bergerson credited many of the book's palindromes, proved to be a popular character among logologists. He was the subject of several anecdotes and eventually a comprehensive twelve-page biography by Robert Funt.

== See also ==
- Borgmann, Dmitri (1965). Language on Vacation: An Olio of Orthographical Oddities. New York: Charles Scribner's Sons.
