= Howard W. Bergerson =

American writer and poet

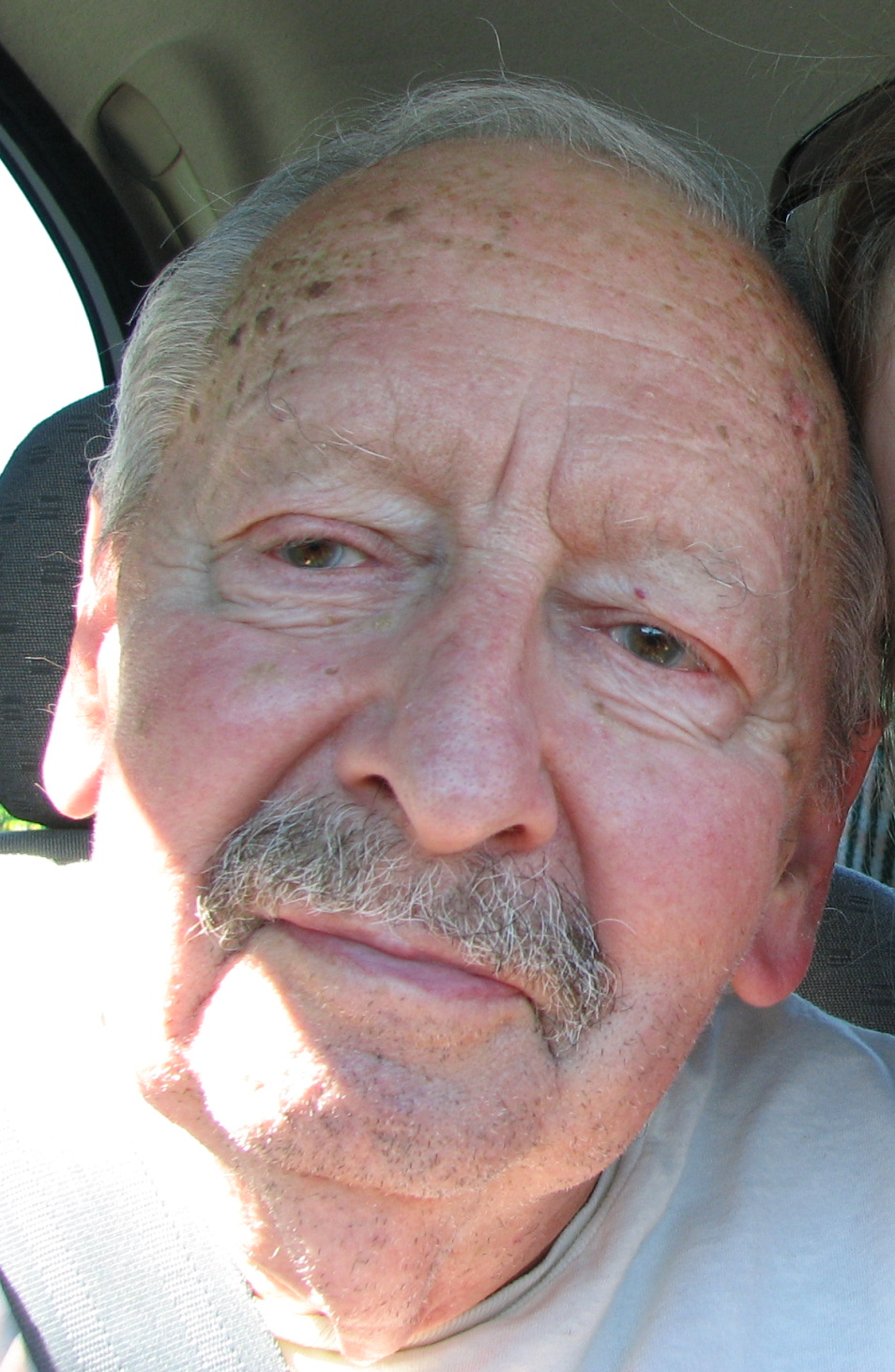
- Howard W. Bergerson in 2007
- Born: July 29, 1922; Minneapolis, Minnesota
- Died: February 19, 2011 (aged 88); Kirkland, Washington
- Occupations: Writer; poet
- Writing career
- Genre: Constrained writing
- Notable works: Palindromes and Anagrams; Word Ways: The Journal of Recreational Linguistics (ed.)

Howard William Bergerson (July 29, 1922 – February 19, 2011) was an American writer and poet, noted for his mastery of palindromes and other forms of wordplay.

== Work ==
Bergerson's first volume of poetry, The Spirit of Adolescence, was published in 1950, and earned him the state's nomination as Oregon Poet Laureate in 1957. However, he declined the nomination for political reasons, and the position instead went to Ethel R. Fuller.

By 1961, Bergerson's interests had shifted to wordplay and constrained writing. He became fascinated with palindromes and set out to write a coherent, full-length palindromic poem. The result, the 1034-letter "Edna Waterfall", was for some time listed by the Guinness Book of World Records as the longest palindrome in English.

In 1969, Bergerson became editor of Word Ways: The Journal of Recreational Linguistics, though stepped down a year later when Greenwood Periodicals dropped the publication. However, he continued to contribute material to Word Ways for several decades, including memorable articles on palindromes, anagrams, panalphabetic windows, pangrammatic windows, self-referencing acrostics, and vocabularyclept poetry. He also published games and puzzles in Reader's Digest and other magazines.

His 1973 book Palindromes and Anagrams was influential among wordplay enthusiasts, and has been hailed by critics as a "sine qua non for all serious logologists" and the greatest ever book on palindromes. He is often cited, along with Leigh Mercer and J. A. Lindon, as one of the greatest palindromists of all time.

== Personal life ==
Bergerson was born in Minneapolis, Minnesota on July 29, 1922. His mother, Margaret Jeske, later married Ludvick Bergerson, who became his adopted father. Bergerson's youth was spent in the mill towns of the Pacific Northwest. After serving in the US Army in the Guadalcanal Campaign of World War II, he moved to Sweet Home, Oregon, down the road from the mill where he worked as a shingle weaver for over 50 years. In 1967 he met and married Nellie Wilson (née McLaughlin) and adopted her three youngest children; the marriage lasted until Nellie's death in 1987. His subsequent marriage, to Christine Stamm, lasted three years.

In 2010 Bergerson moved from Sweet Home to Woodinville, Washington. He died the following year in Kirkland, Washington.

== Bibliography ==
- Howard W. Bergerson. The Spirit of Adolescence. Little Press, 1950.
- ———. Palindromes and Anagrams. Dover Publications, 1973. ISBN 978-0-486-20664-6.
- ———. Posterity Is You. 1977.
- ———. The Cosmic Sieve Hypothesis. Greenwood Periodicals, 1986.
- ———. Earth: The Crossroads of the Cosmos. 1990.
