= Buffalo buffalo Buffalo buffalo buffalo buffalo Buffalo buffalo =

Sentence composed of homonyms

Simplified parse tree: S – sentence; NP – noun phrase; RC – relative clause; VP – verb phrase; PN – proper noun; N – noun; V – verb

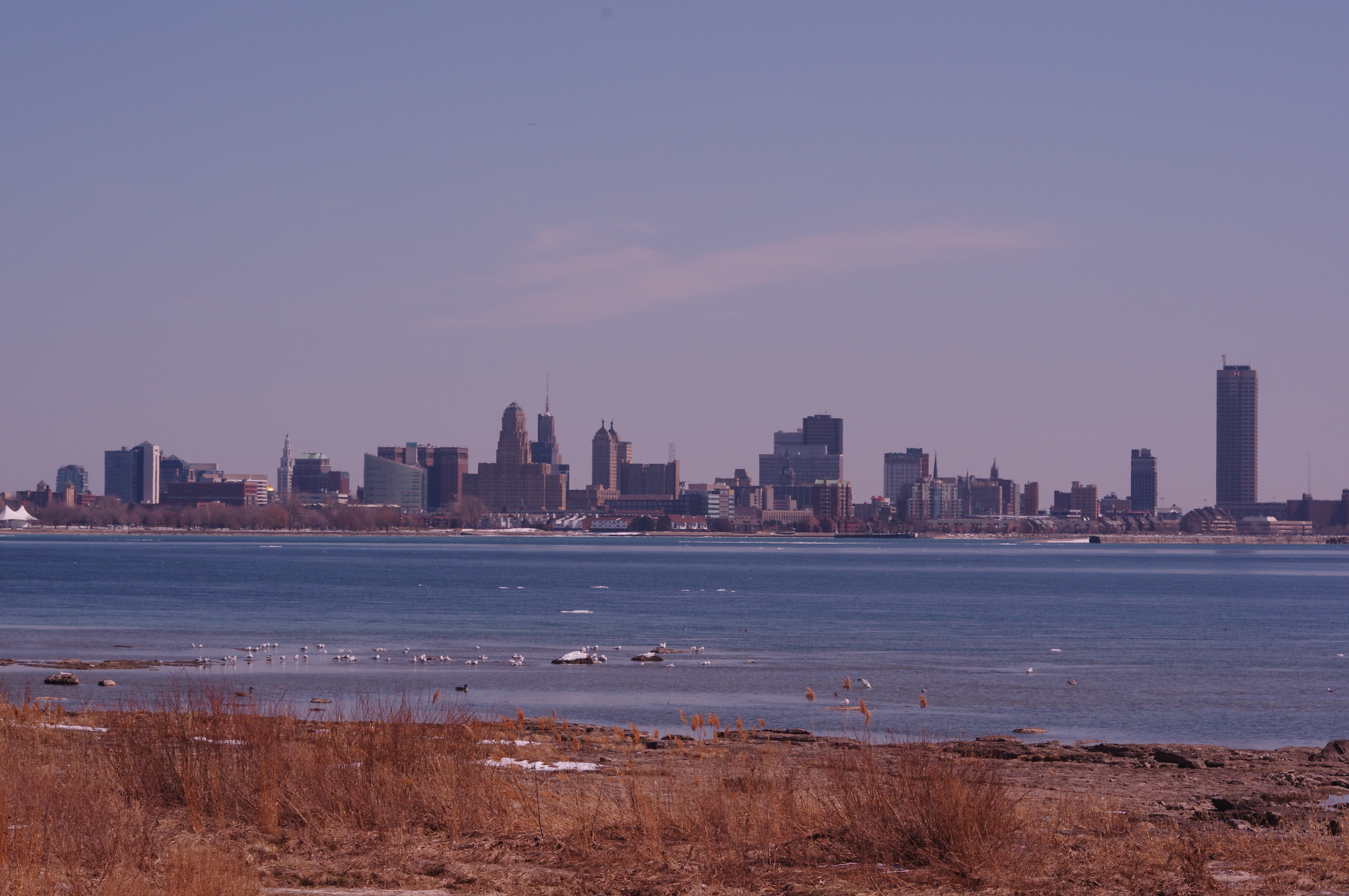
City of Buffalo, New York

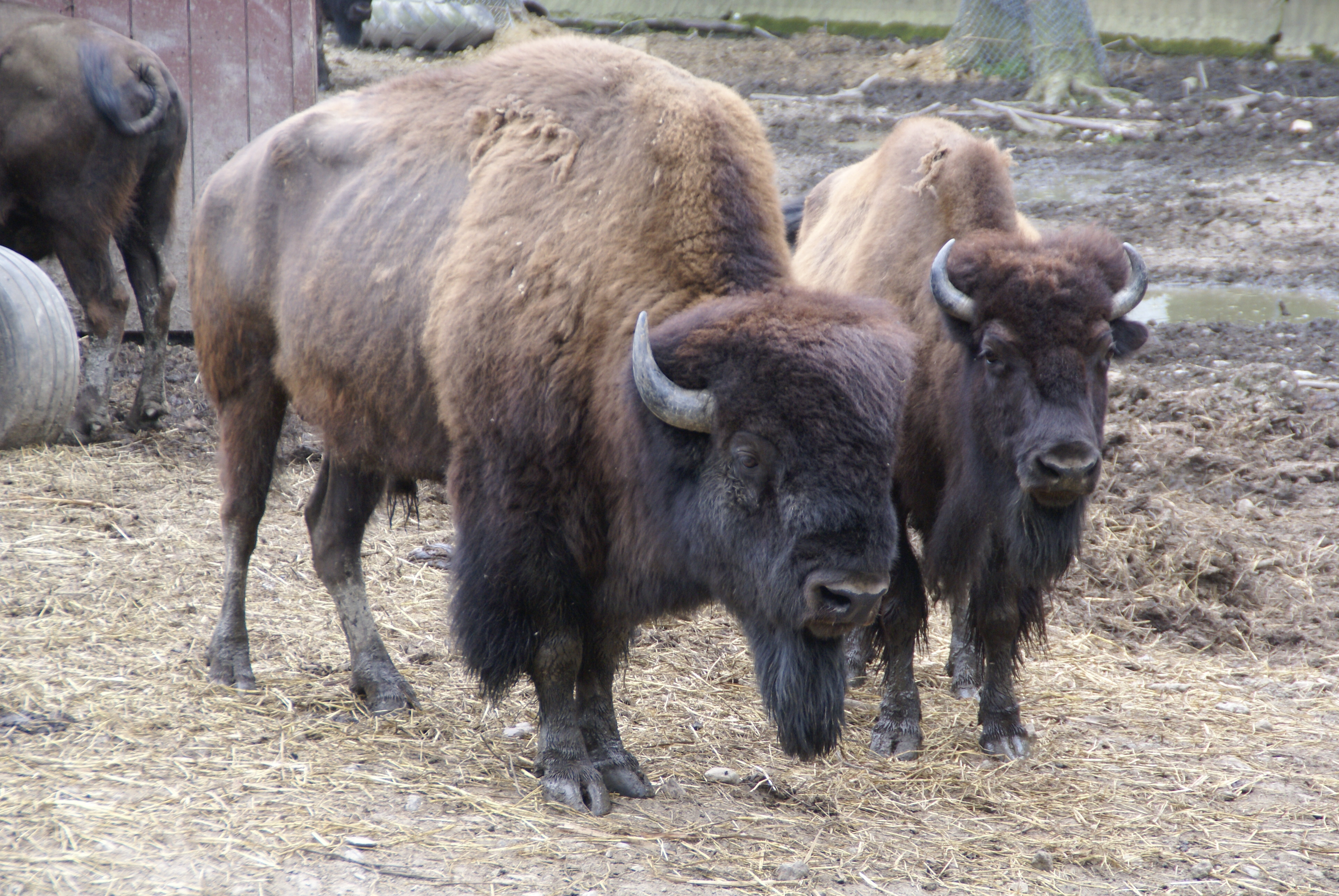
American bison, colloquially referred to as buffalo

Buffalo buffalo Buffalo buffalo buffalo buffalo Buffalo buffalo is a sentence that is grammatically correct in English that is often presented as an example of how homonyms and homophones can be used to create complicated linguistic constructs through lexical ambiguity. It has been discussed in literature in various forms since 1967, when it appeared in Dmitri Borgmann's Beyond Language: Adventures in Word and Thought.

In meaning, the sentence describes a cycle of violence among bovids: "Buffalonian bison that other Buffalonian bison bully do in turn also bully Buffalonian bison."

== Sentence construction ==
Reed–Kellogg diagram of the sentence

The sentence is unpunctuated and uses three different readings of the word "buffalo". In order of their first use, these are:

- a. a city named Buffalo. This is used as a noun adjunct in the sentence;
- n. the noun buffalo, an animal, in the plural (equivalent to "buffaloes" or "buffalos"), in order to avoid articles.
- v. the verb "buffalo" meaning to outwit, confuse, deceive, intimidate, or baffle.

The sentence is syntactically ambiguous; one possible parse (marking each "buffalo" with its part of speech as shown above) is as follows:

Buffalo^{a} buffalo^{n} Buffalo^{a} buffalo^{n} buffalo^{v} buffalo^{v} Buffalo^{a} buffalo^{n}.

When grouped syntactically, this is equivalent to: [(Buffalonian bison) (Buffalonian bison intimidate)] intimidate (Buffalonian bison). Because the sentence has a restrictive clause, there can be no commas. The relative pronouns "which" or "that" could appear between the second and third words of the sentence, as in Buffalo buffalo that Buffalo buffalo buffalo buffalo Buffalo buffalo; when this pronoun is omitted, the relative clause becomes a reduced relative clause.

Thus, the parsed sentence claims that bison who are intimidated or bullied by bison do themselves intimidate or bully bison (at least in the city of Buffalo – implicitly, Buffalo, New York):

1. Buffalo buffalo (animals called "buffalo" from the city of Buffalo) [that] Buffalo buffalo buffalo (that the same kind of animals from the city bully) buffalo Buffalo buffalo (bully these animals from that city).
2. [Those] buffalo(es) from Buffalo [that are intimidated by] buffalo(es) from Buffalo intimidate buffalo(es) from Buffalo.
3. Bison from Buffalo, New York, who are intimidated by other bison in their community in turn intimidate other bison in their community.
4. The buffalo from Buffalo who are buffaloed by buffalo from Buffalo buffalo (verb) other buffalo from Buffalo.
5. Buffalo buffalo (main clause subject) [that] Buffalo buffalo (subordinate clause subject) buffalo (subordinate clause verb) in turn buffalo (main clause verb) Buffalo buffalo (main clause direct object).
6. Buffalo from Buffalo [that] buffalo [from] Buffalo buffalo [in turn] buffalo buffalo [from] Buffalo.

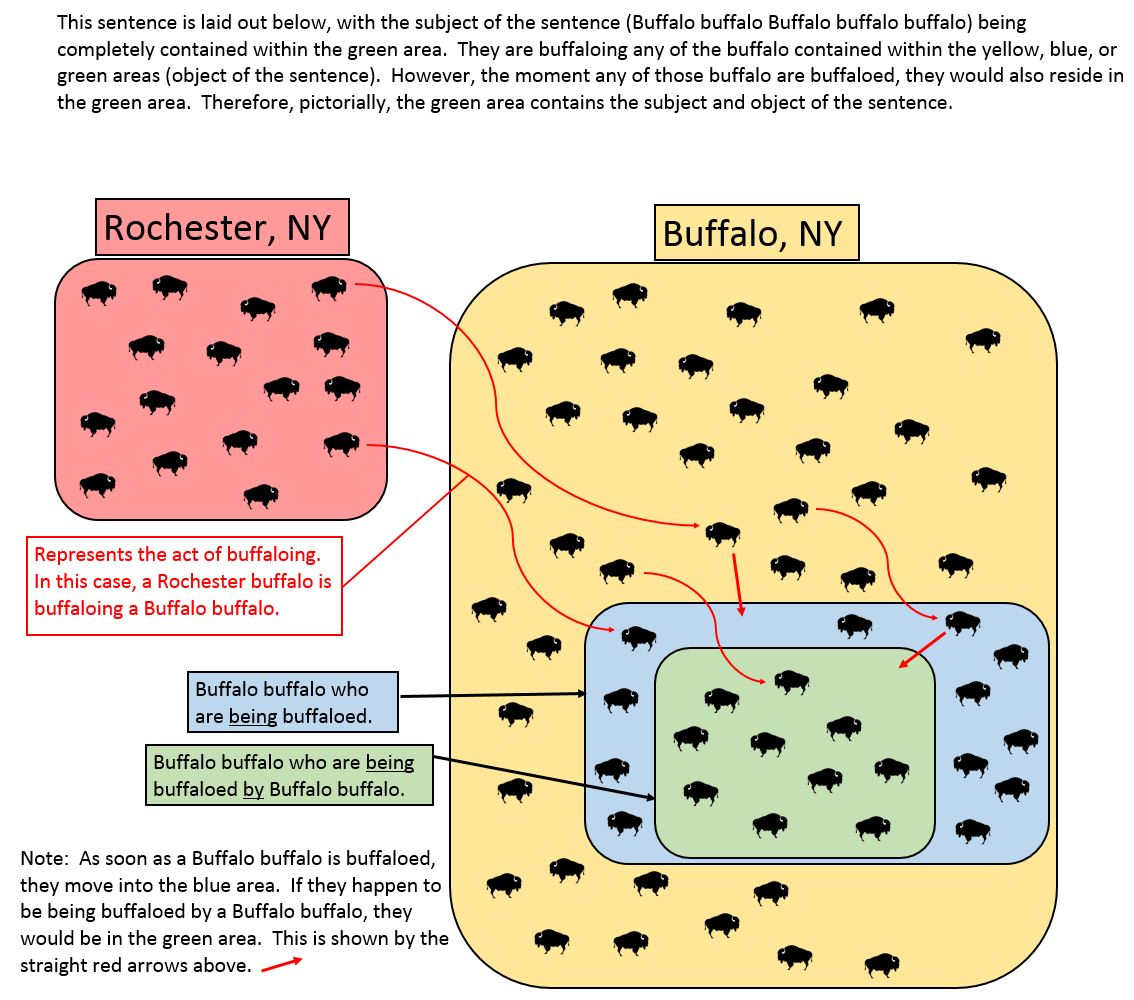
A diagram explaining the sentence

Diagram using a comparison to explain the buffalo sentence

=== Usage ===
Thomas Tymoczko has pointed out that there is nothing special about eight "buffalos"; any sentence consisting solely of the word "buffalo" repeated any number of times is grammatically correct. The shortest is "Buffalo!", which can be taken as a verbal imperative instruction to bully someone ("[You,] buffalo!") with the implied subject "you" removed, or, as a noun exclamation, expressing e.g. that a buffalo has been sighted, or as an adjectival exclamation, e.g. as a response to the question, "where are you from?" Sentences longer than eight words can be constructed by adding further relative clauses. Tymoczko uses the sentence as an example illustrating rewrite rules in linguistics.

== Origin ==
The idea that one can construct a grammatically correct sentence consisting of nothing but repetitions of "buffalo" was independently discovered several times in the 20th century. The earliest known written example, "Buffalo buffalo buffalo buffalo", appears in the original manuscript for Dmitri Borgmann's 1965 book Language on Vacation, though the chapter containing it was omitted from the published version. Borgmann recycled some of the material from this chapter, including the "buffalo" sentence, in his 1967 book, Beyond Language: Adventures in Word and Thought. In 1972, William J. Rapaport, then a graduate student at Indiana University, came up with versions containing five and ten instances of "buffalo". He later used both versions in his teaching, and in 1992 posted them to the LINGUIST List. A sentence with eight consecutive buffalos is featured in Steven Pinker's 1994 book The Language Instinct as an example of a sentence that is "seemingly nonsensical" but grammatical. Pinker names his student, Ann Senghas, as the inventor of the sentence.

Neither Rapaport, Pinker, nor Senghas were initially aware of the earlier coinages. Pinker learned of Rapaport's earlier example only in 1994, and Rapaport was not informed of Borgmann's sentence until 2006.

Versions of this linguistic oddity can be constructed with other words which similarly simultaneously serve as collective noun, adjective, and verb, some of which need no capitalization (such as "police"). Police is a noun for a cop, a verb for what a cop does, and the name of a city in Poland.

== See also ==
General:

- Antanaclasis – Type of pun
- Bison bison bison – Subspecies of bison
- Eats, Shoots & Leaves – 2003 non-fiction book on punctuation by Lynne Truss
- List of linguistic example sentences
- Polyptoton – Stylistic device
- Semantic satiation – Psychological phenomenon

Other linguistically complex sentences:

- James while John had had had had had had had had had had had a better effect on the teacher – Grammatically correct sentence demonstrating lexical ambiguity
- Lion-Eating Poet in the Stone Den – Classical Chinese poem in which every syllable is pronounced as shi, though with varying tones
- Neko no ko koneko, shishi no ko kojishi – Japanese sentence which can be written using the same character 12 times
- That that is is that that is not is not is that it it is
