= William J. Rapaport =

American philosopher

- Born: William Joseph Rapaport

Education
- Education: University at Buffalo
- Thesis: Intentionality and the Structure of Existence (1976)
- Doctoral advisor: Héctor-Neri Castañeda

Philosophical work
- Era: Contemporary philosophy
- Region: Western philosophy
- School: Analytic philosophy
- Doctoral students: Janyce Wiebe
- Main interests: Philosophy of language, ontology, philosophy of computer science
- Notable ideas: Dual copula strategy Technical objections to guise theory "Buffalo buffalo Buffalo buffalo buffalo buffalo Buffalo buffalo"

William Joseph Rapaport is an American philosopher who is an associate professor emeritus of the University at Buffalo.

== Philosophical work ==
Rapaport has done research and written extensively on intentionality and artificial intelligence. He has research interests in computer science, artificial intelligence (AI), computational linguistics, cognitive science, logic and mathematics, and published many scientific articles on them.

While a philosophy graduate student at Indiana University in 1972, he concocted the sentence: "Buffalo buffalo Buffalo buffalo buffalo buffalo Buffalo buffalo". Throughout his career he developed this theme, and discussed it extensively. However, the idea of a grammatically correct sentence repeating "buffalo" was independently discovered several times in the 20th century, such as in Dmitri Borgmann's 1967 book, Beyond Language: Adventures in Word and Thought.

His early work on nonexistent objects was influenced by Alexius Meinong.

Rapaport has written on the field of intentionality, influencing scientists and writers including Daniel Dennett, Héctor-Neri Castañeda (who was his doctoral advisor) and John Searle (with whom he disagrees). Rapaport is interested in science educational theory, and received the New York Chancellor's Award for Excellence in Teaching.

== Other activities ==
In June 1988, Rapaport compiled a list of restaurants in the Buffalo area for attendees of an ACL meeting at SUNY Buffalo. The list was continued, becoming interactive, with user reviews of restaurants.

Rapaport and his wife Mary, with whom he has a son Michael, are the principal donors to the Lucille Ball-Desi Arnaz Center in Jamestown, NY. The Desilu Playhouse, located in the Rapaport Center, contains memorabilia and other vintage I Love Lucy items. He and his wife have also purchased and renovated Lucille Ball's childhood home in Celoron, New York.

== Books and articles ==
- Intentionality and the Structure of Existence, unpublished Ph.D. Indiana University, 1976.
- "Meinongian Theories and a Russellian Paradox", Noûs, 12(2) (1978), pp. 153–80.
- Thought, Language, and Ontology: Essays in Memory of Hector-Neri Castañeda. Edited by William J. Rapaport et al. Includes various essays by Rapaport and his colleagues. ISBN 9780792351979
- Cognition and Fiction, with Stuart C. Shapiro (PostScript format)
- "To Be and Not To Be"
- "Representing Fiction in SNePS"
- In Defense of Contextual Vocabulary Acquisition
- "What Did You Mean by That? Misunderstanding, Negotiation, and Syntactic Semantics"
- "Yes, She Was!", reply to Ford's "Helen Keller Was Never in a Chinese Room"
- "Predication, fiction, and artificial intelligence"
- "On cogito propositions"
- "Because mere calculation isn't thinking"
- Philosophy of Computer Science, online textbook on connections between philosophy, computer science and artificial intelligence, constantly being updated
