= Screw (disambiguation) =

A screw is an externally threaded fastener. Screw or screws may also refer to:

== Engineering and mathematics ==
- Devices with a helical thread:
  - Screw (simple machine)
    - Screw thread, screw thread principles and standards
    - Archimedes' screw, a simple machine for transporting water to a higher elevation
  - Leadscrew, a type of screw used to provide controlled and quantifiable movement in machine tools
- Screw (motion), a description of spiral motion used in rigid body dynamics
- Screw propeller
- Screw, some specific pair of vectors (e.g., force+moment or linear+angular velocity); see Screw theory
- Screw axis, the axis of rotation in 3D geometry

== People with the name ==
- Homer Screws (born 1966), American soccer defender
- Kattie B. Screws (born 1930), matriarch of the Jackson family of American singers
- William W. Screws (1839–1913), American politician in Alabama

== Arts, entertainment, and media ==
=== Music ===
- Screw (band), a Japanese rock band
- "Screw" (song), a 2009 song by Japanese singer Kotoko
- "Screws", a 2008 song by Psapp from The Camel's Back
- A Screw, an EP by Swans
- Chopped and screwed music, a technique of remixing hip hop music by slowing the tempo
- "(Let's Dance) The Screw", a 1963 song by The Crystals

=== Other uses in arts, entertainment, and media ===
- Screw (magazine), a pornographic magazine
- Screw (TV series), 2022 UK prison drama

== Other ==
- Screws v. United States, 1945 US Supreme Court case
- Screw is a slang term for a prison officer in some Commonwealth countries

== See also ==
- Screwed (disambiguation)
- Thumbscrew (disambiguation)
