= J. A. Lindon =

English puzzle enthusiast and poet (1914–1979)

- Born: James Albert Lindon c. 1914
- Died: 16 December 1979
- Occupations: Writer, poet
- Writing career
- Genres: Light verse, constrained writing

James Albert Lindon (c. 1914 – 16 December 1979) was an English puzzle enthusiast and poet specialising in light verse, constrained writing, and children's poetry.

Lindon was based in Addlestone and Weybridge. His poems often won weekly newspaper competitions, but seldom appeared in anthologies, though poems of his did appear in Yet More Comic and Curious Verse, compiled by J. M. Cohen, published by Penguin Books in 1959. Among his anthologised works are numerous parodies, including spoofs of Dylan Thomas, E. E. Cummings, T. E. Brown, Lewis Carroll, Rudyard Kipling, and Ernest L. Thayer. His palindromic poems appeared occasionally in Word Ways: The Journal of Recreational Linguistics, and several were collected in Howard W. Bergerson's Palindromes and Anagrams. Lindon is also noted as being the world's first writer of vocabularyclept poetry, in which poems are constructed by rearranging the words of an existing poem.

Author Martin Gardner often spoke highly of Lindon's poetry, referring to him as the greatest English writer of comic verse. His skill at wordplay was similarly lauded, with Gardner, Bergerson, Dmitri Borgmann, and others proclaiming him to be among the world's finest palindromists.

In addition to being a poet, Lindon was an accomplished writer and solver of puzzles, especially those in recreational mathematics. He was responsible for most of the pioneering work on antimagic squares.

== Bibliography ==
Lindon's poetry appears in the following anthologies, edited volumes, and journals:

- J. M. Cohen, ed. Yet More Comic and Curious Verse. Penguin, 1959.
- Worm Runner's Digest. 1959–.
- The Guinness Book of Poetry 1958–59. Putnam, 1960.
- Martin Gardner. The Annotated Snark. Simon & Schuster, 1962.
- Martin Gardner, ed. The Annotated Casey at the Bat: A Collection of Ballads about the Mighty Casey. Dover, 1967.
- Word Ways: The Journal of Recreational Linguistics. Greenwood Periodicals et al., 1968–.
- Howard W. Bergerson. Palindromes and Anagrams. Dover, 1973.
- Oxford Dictionary of Phrase, Saying, and Quotation, Oxford University Press, 1997.
