= Heterogram (literature) =

Word, phrase or sentence with no repeated letter

A heterogram (from hetero-, meaning 'different', + -gram, meaning 'written') is a word, phrase, or sentence in which no letter of the alphabet occurs more than once. The terms isogram and nonpattern word have also been used to mean the same thing.

It is not clear who coined or popularized the term "heterogram". The concept appears in Dmitri Borgmann's 1965 book Language on Vacation: An Olio of Orthographical Oddities but he uses the term isogram. In a 1985 article, Borgmann claims to have "launched" the term isogram then. He also suggests an alternative term, asogram, to avoid confusion with lines of constant value such as contour lines, but uses isogram in the article itself.

Isogram has also been used to mean a string where each letter present is used the same number of times. Multiple terms have been used to describe words where each letter used appears a certain number of times. For example, a word where every featured letter appears twice, like "noon", might be called a pair isogram, a second-order isogram, or a 2-isogram.

A perfect pangram is an example of a heterogram, with the added restriction that it uses all the letters of the alphabet.

== Uses in ciphers ==
A ten-letter heterogram can be used as the key to a substitution cipher for numbers, with the heterogram encoding the string 1234567890 or 0123456789. This is used in businesses where salespeople and customers traditionally haggle over sales prices, such as used-car lots and pawn shops. The nominal value or minimum sale price for an item can be listed on a tag for the salesperson's reference while being visible but meaningless to the customer.

A twelve-letter cipher could be used to indicate months of the year.

== Longest examples ==
In the book Language on Vacation: An Olio of Orthographical Oddities, Dmitri Borgmann tries to find the longest such word. The longest one he found was "dermatoglyphics" at 15 letters. He coins several longer hypothetical words, such as "thumbscrew-japingly" (18 letters, defined as "as if mocking a thumbscrew") and, with the "uttermost limit in the way of verbal creativeness", "pubvexingfjord-schmaltzy" (23 letters, defined as "as if in the manner of the extreme sentimentalism generated in some individuals by the sight of a majestic fjord, which sentimentalism is annoying to the clientele of an English inn").

The word "subdermatoglyphic" was constructed by Edward R. Wolpow. Later, in the book Making the Alphabet Dance, Ross Eckler reports the word "subdermatoglyphic" (17 letters) can be found in an article by Lowell Goldsmith called Chaos: To See a World in a Grain of Sand and a Heaven in a Wild Flower. He also found the name "Melvin Schwarzkopf" (17 letters), a man living in Alton, Illinois, and proposed the name "Emily Jung Schwartzkopf" (21 letters). In an elaborate story, Eckler talked about a group of scientists who name the unavoidable urge to speak in pangrams the "Hjelmqvist-Gryb-Zock-Pfund-Wax syndrome".

The longest German heterogram is "Heizölrückstoßabdämpfung" (heating oil recoil dampening) which uses 24 of the 30 letters in the German alphabet, as ä, ö, ü, and ß are considered distinct letters from a, o, u, and s in German. It is closely followed by "Boxkampfjuryschützlinge" (boxing-match jury protégés) and "Zwölftonmusikbücherjagd" (twelve-tone music book chase) with 23 letters.

== Other examples ==
=== Words ===
==== 17 letters ====
- subdermatoglyphic

==== 16 letters ====
- uncopyrightables

==== 15 letters ====
- dermatoglyphics
- (Ductus) endolymphaticus
- Hamburgefonstiv
- hydropneumatics
- hyperabductions
- hyperosculating
- misconjugatedly
- motherfuckingly
- prediscountably
- uncopyrightable

==== 14 letters ====
- ambidextrously
- computerizably
- copyrightables
- croquet-playing
- dermatoglyphic
- doubletracking
- endolymphatics
- housewarmingly
- hydromagnetics
- hydropneumatic
- hyperabduction
- neurolymphatic
- outpervadingly
- outspreadingly
- preshadowingly
- prezygomaticus
- profundicately
- pseudomythical
- subformatively
- troublemakings
- unabsorptively
- undiscoverably
- unprodictables
- venustraphobic

==== 13 letters ====
- chimneyboards
- copyrightable
- configurables
- consumptively
- cyberflashing
- cyberstalking
- deformulating
- deplatforming
- documentarily
- draughtswomen
- endolymphatic
- flamethrowing
- flowchartings
- hydromagnetic
- hypnotizables
- hypsometrical
- incomputables
- lycanthropies
- metalworkings
- misconjugated
- motherfucking
- multibranched
- musicotherapy
- neurotypicals
- objurgatively
- outbreakingly
- outresampling
- overadjusting
- pneumogastric
- preondactylus
- profundicates
- reticulophagy
- salpingectomy
- semigroupably
- semivoluntary
- shockumentary
- subordinately
- sycophantized
- troublemaking
- uncombatively
- uncomprisable
- uncopyrighted
- undisprovable
- unformatively
- unmaledictory
- unpredictably
- unproactively
- unprobatively
- unproblematic
- unsympathetic
- unsympathised
- unsympathized

==== 12 letters ====
- absorptively
- ambidextrous
- amblygonites
- amylopectins
- bankruptcies
- blastodermic
- bluestocking
- blockheadism
- buryingplace
- cabinetworks
- centrifugals
- computerniks
- configurable
- configurated
- configurates
- considerably
- countermaids
- counterplays
- countervails
- cryptomnesia
- customizable
- demographics
- demonstrably
- descrambling
- discountable
- discountably
- discoverably
- discrepantly
- dismountable
- disreputably
- doublethinks
- drumbeatings
- earthmovings
- edulcurating
- euchromatins
- exclusionary
- exculpations
- expurgations
- exhaustingly
- facientously
- farsightedly
- flexographic
- flowcharting
- francophiles
- gourmandizes
- granulocytes
- hamburgevons
- headstrongly
- hematoxylins
- horsebacking
- housewarming
- hydromancies
- hypnotizable
- hypoinflated
- hypoinflates
- hyponatremic
- imponderably
- importunable
- impersonably
- imponderably
- incomputable
- incomputably
- introducably
- kymographies
- lexicographs
- lexicography
- limnocryptes
- loudspeaking
- lubavitchers
- lycanthropes
- malnourished
- manuscripted
- mendaciously
- metalworking
- multipronged
- neuropathics
- neuroplastic
- neurotypical
- nightwalkers
- outbreakings
- outpervading
- outpleadings
- outpreaching
- outreachings
- outscreaming
- outsearching
- outsparkling
- outspreading
- outvarnished
- overflashing
- overhaulings
- overmatching
- oversampling
- overstapling
- overstudying
- overwatching
- packinghouse
- patchworking
- pelargoniums
- phagocytised
- phagocytized
- phagocytizes
- phytoalexins
- placentiform
- plyromantics
- polycentrism
- postcardlike
- preadjusting
- predaciously
- preshadowing
- prezygomatic
- problematics
- productively
- profundicate
- questionably
- recognisably
- recognizably
- repadlocking
- resumptional
- ropewalkings
- stakeholding
- stenographic
- stickhandler
- stupefyingly
- subformative
- subjectional
- submediantly
- subnormality
- subportmanic
- subvocalized
- subzygomatic
- symbolicated
- thunderclaps
- unabsorptive
- uncombatives
- uncompatible
- uncomplexity
- uncreditably
- undespotical
- undomestical
- unforgivable
- unforgivably
- unformidable
- unglamorised
- unglamorized
- unhairstyled
- unhospitable
- unhysterical
- unimprovable
- unmethodical
- unmicrowaved
- unostracized
- unperishably
- unphlegmatic
- unproclaimed
- unprofitable
- unprofitably
- unprovidable
- unspheroidal
- unsportively
- upholstering
- voluntaryism
- xylographies

There are hundreds of eleven-letter isograms, over one thousand ten-letter isograms and thousands of such nine-letter words.

=== Phrases and sentences ===
- Cwm fjord bank glyphs vext quiz. (26, perfect pangram)
- Blocky dwarf zings the jump. (A. Maag) (23, missing Q, V, and X)
- Gents flock & jump Dr. Vax biz. Q: Why? (Matthew Fenimore) (26, perfect [[pangram]])
- Nymphs beg for quick waltz. (Angus Walker) (22, missing D, J, V, and X)
- Nymphs flicked gox quartz. (Rehan B.) (22, missing B, J, V, and W)
- The big dwarf only jumps. (Alain Brobecker) (20, missing C, K, Q, V, X, and Z)

==== In French ====
- Le bon Giscard! (12)
- Lampez un fort whisky! (Alain Brobecker) (18)
- Plombez vingt fuyards! (Alain Brobecker) (19, missing C, H, J, K, Q, W, and X)

==== In German ====
- "Fix, Schwyz!", quäkt Jürgen blöd vom Paß. (30, perfect pangram)
- Malitzschkendorf (16): German city

==== In Danish ====
- Høj bly gom vandt fræk sexquiz på wc. (29, perfect pangram)

==== In Portuguese ====
- Velho traduz, sim! (14)

==== In Spanish ====
- Centrifugadlos (14, longest heterogramatic word in Spain Spanish (not the case for Latin American Spanish) It's the result of the plural 3rd person verb centrifugar in informal second-person plural imperative

== See also ==
- Pangram
