= Peter Sears =

Peter Sears may refer to:

- Peter Sears (poet) (1937–2017), American poet
- Peter Sears (ice hockey) (born 1947), American ice hockey player
- Peter Sears (musician) (born 1948), English rock musician
