= Logology (linguistics) =

Activity that encompasses a wide variety of word games and wordplay

Logology (or ludolinguistics) is the field of recreational linguistics, an activity that encompasses a wide variety of word games and wordplay. The term is analogous to the term "recreational mathematics".

== Overview ==
Some of the topics studied in logology are lipograms, acrostics, palindromes, tautonyms, isograms, pangrams, bigrams, trigrams, tetragrams, transdeletion pyramids, and pangrammatic windows.

The term logology was adopted by Dmitri Borgmann to refer to recreational linguistics.

== Notable logologists ==
- Dmitri Borgmann
- A. Ross Eckler, Jr.
- Willard R. Espy
- Jeremiah Farrell
- Martin Gardner
- Mike Keith
- Douglas Hofstadter
- Lila Maria de Coninck

== See also ==
- Constrained writing
- List of forms of word play
- Oulipo
- Word Ways: The Journal of Recreational Linguistics

== Bibliography ==
=== Books ===
- Bergerson, Howard W. (1973). Palindromes and Anagrams. New York: Dover Publications.
- Bombaugh, C.C. (1961). Oddities and Curiosities of Words and Literature. New York: Dover Publications.
- Borgmann, Dmitri (1965). Language on Vacation: An Olio of Orthographical Oddities. New York: Charles Scribner's Sons.
- Borgmann, Dmitri (1967). Beyond Language: Adventures in Word and Thought. New York: Charles Scribner's Sons.
- Eckler, A. Ross Jr. (1997). Making the Alphabet Dance: Recreational Wordplay. New York: St. Martin's Press. ISBN 0-312-15580-8.
- Johnson, Dale D.; von Hoff Johnson, Bonnie; Schlichting, Kathleen (2004). "Logology: Word and language play". In Baumann, James F.; Kame'enui, Edward J. (eds.). Vocabulary Instruction: Research to Practice. Guildford Press. ISBN 1-57230-933-4.

=== Periodicals ===
- Word Ways: The Journal of Recreational Linguistics. Greenwood Periodicals et al., 1968–. ISSN 0043-7980.
- The Palindromist. Mark Saltveit, 1996–.
- The Enigma. National Puzzlers' League, 1883–.
