= Puzzle Lovers Club =

American company

- Type: Private
- Industry: Publishing
- Founded: 1963
- Defunct: ca. 1980
- Headquarters: New York, New York, U.S.
- Parent: René Gnam & Associates

The Puzzle Lovers Club was an American company which ran word game contests by mail.

The company was founded in 1963 by direct marketer René Gnam. Rather than following a conventional publishing or sweepstakes business model, he hit on the idea of presenting his enterprise as an exclusive "club" with a dedicated members' journal, the Puzzle Lovers Newspaper. The Club regularly ran full-page, testimonial-laden ads in magazines such as Popular Science and Popular Mechanics offering tens of thousands of dollars in cash prizes to members who solved its journal's puzzles.

Gnam used the Club as a testbed for hundreds of direct marketing techniques, including upselling books and creative use of mailing lists. Gnam would even rent and send mailshots to other marketers' "No lists"—that is, mailing lists of sweepstakes participants who had explicitly opted out of buying merchandise. Contrary to expectations, this technique produced a very high percentage of responses, and Gnam ended up repeating it for over half a million addressees. Gnam also discovered that it was particularly profitable to use mailing lists which had anything to do with astrology.

Despite its unabashed marketing tactics, the Club successfully wooed several notable puzzle creators. From 1968 to 1971 logologist Dmitri Borgmann was a regular contributor to the Puzzle Lovers Newspaper, and the Club's 1964 reference book Puzzle Lovers Dictionary was a favorite of New York Times crossword editor Will Weng. Both men would go on to start their own respective mail-order puzzle organizations.

== Bibliography ==
- Puzzle Lovers Club (November 6, 1964). Pfeiffer, Orville (ed.). Puzzle Lovers Dictionary. New International Library.
