= Filler text =

Text generated to fill space or provide unremarkable and/or standardised text

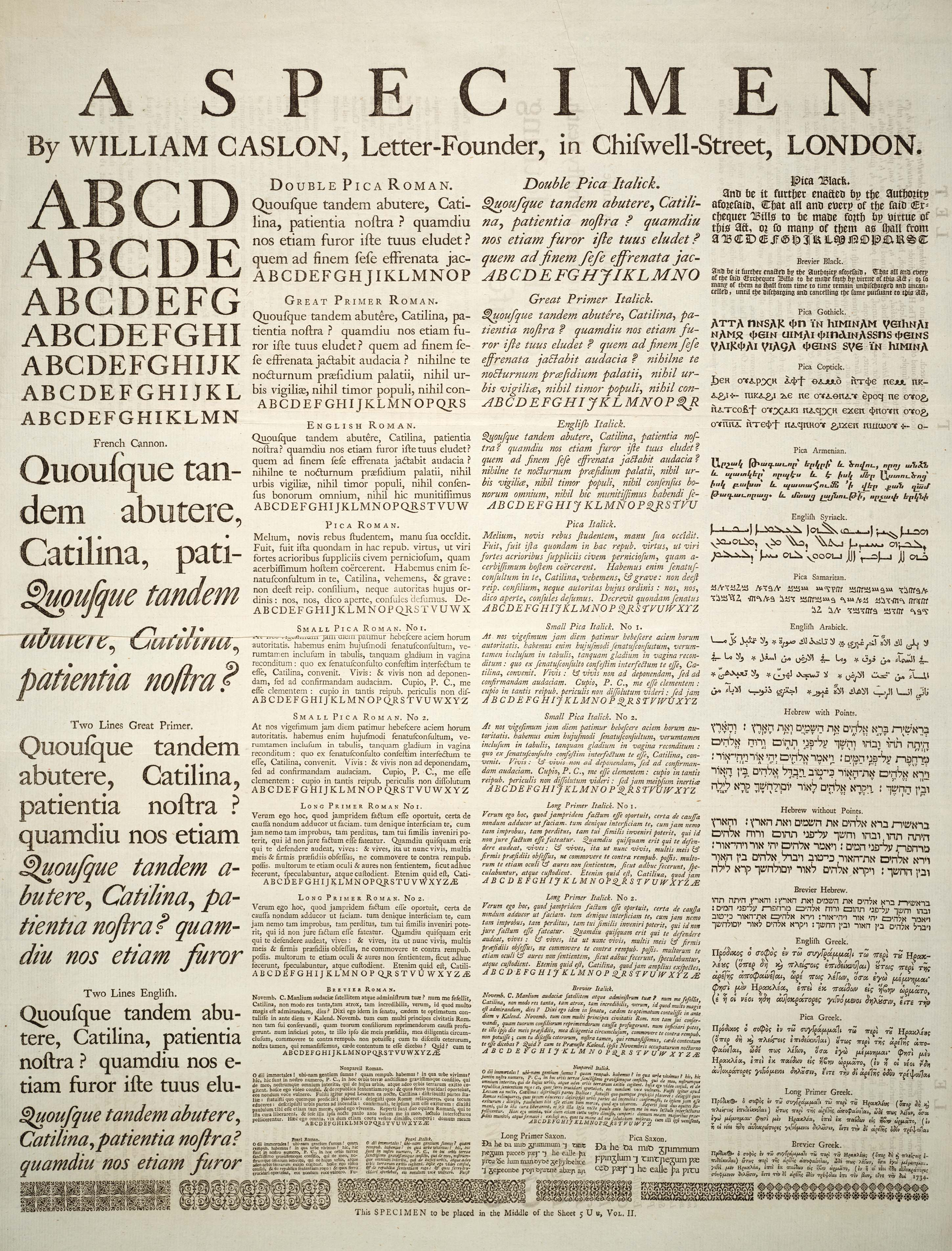
A specimen sheet of typefaces and languages, by William Caslon I, letter founder; from the 1734 Cyclopaedia. It uses as filler text an excerpt from Cicero's first Catiline Oration: "Quousque tandem abutere, Catilina, patientia nostra?"

Filler text (also placeholder text or dummy text) is text that shares some characteristics of a real written text, but is random or otherwise generated. It may be used to display a sample of fonts, generate text for testing, or to spoof an e-mail spam filter. The process of using filler text is sometimes called greeking, although the text itself may be nonsense, or largely Latin, as in Lorem ipsum.

== Asdf ==
ASDF is the sequence of letters that appear on the first four keys on the home row of a QWERTY or QWERTZ keyboard. They are often used as a sample or test case or as random, meaningless nonsense. It is also a common learning tool for keyboard classes, since all four keys are located on the home row.

== Etaoin shrdlu ==
"Etaoin shrdlu" is the approximate order of frequency of the twelve most commonly used letters in the English language, best known as a nonsense phrase that sometimes appeared in print in the days of "hot type" publishing due to a custom of Linotype machine operators.

== Lorem ipsum ==
"Lorem ipsum dolor sit amet..." is one of the most common filler texts, popular with typesetters and graphic designers. It originates from the book De Finibus Bonorum et Malorum and is part-Latin and part-gibberish.

== Now is the time for all good men ==
"Now is the time for all good men to come to the aid of the party" is a phrase first proposed as a typing drill by instructor Charles E. Weller; its use is recounted in his book The Early History of the Typewriter, p. 21 (1918). Frank E. McGurrin, an expert on the early Remington typewriter, used it in demonstrating his touch typing abilities in January 1889. It has appeared in a number of typing books, often in the form "Now is the time for all good men to come to the aid of their country."

== New Petitions and Building Code ==
Many B movies of the 1940s, 50s, and 60s utilized the "spinning newspaper" effect to narrate important plot points that occurred offscreen. The effect necessitated the appearance of a realistic front page, which consisted of a main headline relevant to the plot, and several smaller headlines used as filler. A large number of these spinning newspapers included stories titled "New Petitions Against Tax" and "Building Code Under Fire."

== Character Generator Protocol ==
The Character Generator Protocol (CHARGEN) service is an Internet protocol intended for testing, debugging, and measurement purposes.

The user receives a stream of bytes. Although the specific format of the output is not prescribed by RFC 864, the recommended pattern (and a de facto standard) is shifted lines of 72 ASCII characters repeating.

!"#$%&'()*+,-./0123456789:;<=>?@ABCDEFGHIJKLMNOPQRSTUVWXYZ[\]^_`abcdefgh
"#$%&'()*+,-./0123456789:;<=>?@ABCDEFGHIJKLMNOPQRSTUVWXYZ[\]^_`abcdefghi
#$%&'()*+,-./0123456789:;<=>?@ABCDEFGHIJKLMNOPQRSTUVWXYZ[\]^_`abcdefghij
$%&'()*+,-./0123456789:;<=>?@ABCDEFGHIJKLMNOPQRSTUVWXYZ[\]^_`abcdefghijk

== Unicode replacement character ==
The Unicode replacement character, also known as a tofu box, is a placeholder symbol used to replace missing text if a letter cannot be typed. For example, a missing "é" in "Café" would be written as "Caf�". It is often used when a character is not supported by any typeface in the processing system of the device.

== See also ==
- Sample text in Microsoft Word
- Postmodernism Generator
- The quick brown fox jumps over the lazy dog
- Lorem ipsum
- Hamburgevons
