= Beyond Language =

1967 book by Dmitri Borgmann

Beyond Language: Adventures in Word and Thought
- Author: Dmitri Borgmann
- Language: English
- Published: 1967
- Publisher: Charles Scribner's Sons
- Publication place: United States
- Media type: Print
- Pages: 338
- OCLC: 655067975
- Preceded by: Language on Vacation: An Olio of Orthographical Oddities

Beyond Language: Adventures in Word and Thought is a 1967 book written by Dmitri Borgmann.

== Content ==
Like Borgmann's first book, Language on Vacation: An Olio of Orthographical Oddities, Beyond Language is a treatise on recreational linguistics, and indeed is based in part on material excised from early drafts of Language on Vacation. Unlike its predecessor, however, the main part of the book is presented as a series of 119 self-contained "Problems" with accompanying "Hints" and "Resolutions".

In many cases the problems are bona fide word puzzles, such as challenges to deduce orthographic, phonetic, semantic, or etymological patterns in word lists, or to generate word lists of a given pattern. More often than not, however, the format is simply a conceit which enables the author to expound the results of his lexicographic and logological discoveries. For example, Problem 94 challenges the reader to trace the origin of the word FEAMYNG, a purported collective noun for ferrets. Borgmann's solution, which spans four pages, shows the term to be a ghost word; it was the result of a centuries-long chain of typographical errors (from BUSYNESS to BESYNESS to FESYNES to FESNYNG to FEAMYNG) propagated through various dictionaries. Problem 84 contains the earliest known example in print of the repetitive homonym "Buffalo buffalo buffalo buffalo".

The book also contains a separate set of 18 "Bafflers"—short essays on logological problems for which Borgmann had no complete solution. Topics discussed here include kinship terms, color terms, word squares, letter bigrams, and the mysterious disc shown in Rembrandt's etching Faust in His Study.

The book's appendices contain an extensive bibliography of books and periodicals covering logology.

== Reception and legacy ==
Beyond Language was not as great a success as Language on Vacation but it still attracted favorable reviews. Kirkus Reviews called Borgmann's puzzles "unique" and "challenging", noting that "the persistent can spend a pleasant year in figuring out such problems". Time recommended the book "for the tired scientist, mathematician or logician", emphasizing the intellectual effort needed to solve some of Borgmann's more esoteric challenges.

In the decades since its publication, the book's Problems and Bafflers have proved a fruitful source of logological research. Many of them have been further investigated and developed by A. Ross Eckler, Jr.; Philip M. Cohen; members of the National Puzzlers' League; and others. Other claims made by the book have been challenged and debunked. Of note is a 2003 study by Darryl Francis which investigated Borgmann's assertion that the name "Torpenhow Hill" is a quadruple etymological tautology. It concluded not only that Borgmann's etymology may be incorrect, but also that the hill does not even exist.
