= Heterogram =

Heterogram may refer to:

- Heterogram (literature), a word, phrase, or sentence in which no letter of the alphabet occurs more than once
- Heterogram (linguistics), the use of a graph from a foreign language in a text as a logogram
