= Oregon Poet Laureate =

Official poets for the state of Oregon

The position of Oregon Poet Laureate has existed since 1923. The incumbent is Ellen Waterston.

Oregon poets laureate are appointed by the governor of Oregon. Since 2006, the poet laureate program is administered by the Oregon Cultural Trust.

== List of Oregon poets laureate ==
1. Edwin Markham (1923–1931)
2. Ben Hur Lampman (1951–1954)
3. Ethel Romig Fuller (1957–1965)
4. William Stafford (1975–1990)
5. Lawson Fusao Inada (2006–2010)
6. Paulann Petersen (2010–2014)
7. Peter Sears (2014–2016)
8. Elizabeth Woody (2016–2018)
9. Kim Stafford (2018–2020)
10. Anis Mojgani (2020–2024)
11. Ellen Waterston (2024-Present)
