= El Uqsor =

El Uqsor may refer to:

- El Uqsor or Luxor, the former city of Thebes, Egypt
- El Uqsor, a pseudonym of Dmitri Borgmann
