= The Palindromist =

- Cover of the Fall 1996 issue (№ 1)
- Editor: Mark Saltveit
- Categories: Logology
- Frequency: Irregular
- Publisher: Palindromist Press
- First issue: 1996
- Country: United States
- Based in: Portland, Oregon

The Palindromist is a magazine devoted to palindromes, published since 1996. Initially it was published biannually. The frequency switched to irregular. It is edited by Mark Saltveit, a Portland-based stand-up comedian who won the first-ever World Palindrome Championship.

Each issue of the magazine prints a variety of palindromes in various forms (letter-unit, word-unit, and vertical), covers palindrome-related news, and seeks to accredit writers of famous palindromes. The magazine also covers closely related forms of wordplay, including calculator spelling and written charades.

The magazine organizes the SymmyS Awards, an annual palindrome competition named after a 1991 book by Hugo Brandt Corstius (writing as Battus) and adjudicated by a celebrity panel. Past judges have included Will Shortz, MC Paul Barman, Ben Zimmer, David Allen Cress, "Weird Al" Yankovic, Demetri Martin, and John Flansburgh.

== See also ==
- Word Ways – Magazine on recreational linguistics, logology and word play
