= Sitka Center for Art and Ecology =

Art and ecology center in Oregon, U.S.

Coordinates: 45.047676°N 123.992423°W

The Sitka Center for Art and Ecology, located in Otis, Oregon, United States, was established in 1970 as an entity of the Neskowin Coast Foundation, which was founded May 8, 1970. The Sitka Center was established to expand the relationships between art, ecology, and humanity.

The center offers workshops in writing, art, environmental studies, and other avenues of creative inquiry, in a cluster of classrooms and studios within view of the Pacific Ocean. From September through May, the Sitka Center offers a residency program for artists, writers and scholars.

The center offers selected applicants a place to live and work, free of charge for up to four months; in return, the residents perform community outreach during their stay, including free exhibits and lectures on the Cascade Head Campus.

The Sitka Center was established by Jane and Frank Boyden.

The organization is a member of the Alliance of Artists Communities, which focuses on creating residency opportunities for artists all over the country.

== Notable residents ==
- Robin Cody
- Isabelle Hayeur
- Robert Michael Pyle
- Kim Stafford

== See also ==
- Neskowin, Oregon
