= Hamburgevons =

Text used as a sample for assessing fonts

'Hamburgevons' rendered using seven fonts: Helvetica Neue, Semplicità, Ernestine, Gimlet, Marcia, Adobe Caslon and Garibaldi

The word Hamburgevons (also Hamburgefons, Hamburgefonstiv or Hamburgefönstiv) is a short piece of meaningless filler text used for assessing the design and the appearance of a typeface. It contains all essential forms in a Latin alphabet, so that the character of the respective font can be recognized quickly. It consists of the letters that are often first designed when designing a typeface.

This heterogram is useful for typographers and designers during the design of a font, as the form of its letters includes all of the curves and abutments normally found in a font. As a test word, it is useful for determining the visual readability of a font chosen for a layout. A version of it is often used as a standard word in the visual layout of fonts submitted to competitions and exhibitions.

== See also ==
- Typeface § Texts used to demonstrate typefaces
- Lorem ipsum

== Bibliography ==
Jérôme Peignot, L’Alphabet des lettres, ou le petit hamburgefons, Paris, Imprimerie nationale, 1995, 128 p. (ISBN 978-2940028085).
