= Peter Sears (poet) =

American poet

- Born: May 18, 1937; New York City
- Died: July 20, 2017 (aged 80)
- Education: Yale University
- Occupation: Poet

Peter H. Sears (May 18, 1937 – July 20, 2017) was an American poet based in Oregon. In 2014, he was named the seventh poet laureate of the U.S. state of Oregon.

== Literary career ==
Sears was born in New York City on May 18, 1937. He graduated from Yale University and the Iowa Writers' Workshop. He won the 1999 Peregrine Smith Poetry Competition and the 2000 Western States Poetry Prize for his book of poems, The Brink. His first book-length collection, Tour, was published in 1987. He has also published four chapbooks of poetry and two teaching books, Secret Writing and Gonna Bake Me a Rainbow Poem. His work has been published in many magazines and literary journals, widely anthologized and included in the radio series, The Writer's Almanac. His most recent full-length book is titled Green Diver.

Sears founded and managed the Oregon Literary Coalition and co-founded the non-profit organization Friends of William Stafford.

Sears moved to Oregon in 1974 to teach creative writing at Reed College, he also taught at the Northwest Writing Institute at Lewis & Clark College and Portland Community College. He was active in the publishing company Rubberstampmadness Inc. in Corvallis and Community of Writers in Portland.
