= Delina Filkins =

American supercentenarian (1815–1928)

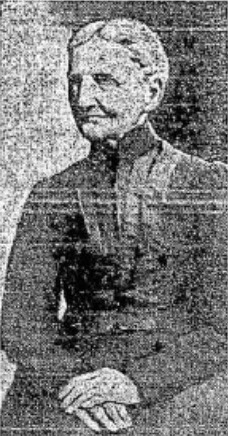
- Born: Delina Ecker; 4 May 1815; Stark, New York, US
- Died: 4 December 1928 (aged 113 years, 214 days); Richfield Springs, New York, US
- Resting place: Van Hornesville Cemetery, Stark, New York
- Known for: Being a supercentenarian; the first person recorded to reach the ages of 112 and 113
- Spouse: John D Filkins (m. 1834; died 1890)
- Children: 6

Delina Filkins (née Ecker; 4 May 1815 – 4 December 1928) was an American supercentenarian, and the first person verifiably to reach the age of 113. Noted during her own lifetime for her advanced age in the local and national press, she lived an otherwise ordinary life. Filkins' case has since been noted as particularly important, being the first person in recorded demographic history to have lived to the ages of 112 and 113. Her age at death (113 years, 214 days) was not surpassed until 1979.

== Life ==
Delina Filkins was born on 4 May 1815 in Stark, New York, daughter of William Ecker and Susanna Herwick. Her parents were descendants of Dutch and German settlers, who had arrived in New York during the 1700s. She attended school until the age of 11, before work at home spinning flax into yarn. On 19 February 1834, at the age of 18, Delina married local farmer John D. Filkins, going on to have at least six children: Joseph (1836–1891), Cornelia (1837–1900), William (1839–1909), Alonzo (1841–1929), Barney (1848–1928), and Frank (1854–1932). It appears a seventh (Evelyn, b. 1850) died in infancy. The couple ran a cheese-making business. John Filkins died on 3 June 1890.

According to Robert Douglas Young, and as reported in newspapers during her later years, Filkins was known for her "hard work", "self-reliant philosophy", "tough personality" and "self-sufficiency", well into old age.

In her later years, Filkins' age caught the attention first of the local, and later of the national, media. She received local from about 1916, and national attention from the 1920s, by then over 100. Her birthdays grew to become "community events", with far flung visitors and Presidential greetings. She was described as having "retained the possession of her faculties in a wonderful degree to the end of her long life". Filkins gave "quiet living and working hard, with no excitement" as her secret.

The significant change Filkins witnessed during her lifetime was much discussed. It was noted, for example, that at the time of her birth James Madison was President of the United States, and she could remember when the Erie Canal was opened. She was 100 years old when she first rode in an automobile. At 113, she was reported as intending to vote for Herbert Hoover in the 1928 United States presidential election, the right to vote having been granted to American women in 1920, when Delina was 105.

== Death and legacy ==
Delina Filkins died at the home of her grandson in Richfield Springs, New York on 4 December 1928, and the death was widely reported. The headline in The New York Times read: "Oldest Woman in State Died in Her Chair, Refusing to Go to Bed".

Filkins was regularly used as an example of extreme longevity in books and other publications, and was included in the Guinness Book of World Records, which noted that 'she never wore spectacles'. In 2020, Robert Douglas Young conducted a close examination of Filkins' life to confirm the validity of the claim that she had been the first person to reach 113. He concluded that "the amount and consistency of the available documentation suggest that Delina Filkins did indeed reach age 113 in 1928". An earlier article, published in 1980, by A. Ross Eckler had reached the same conclusion. Young also noted Filkins' distinction as the only validated case "of all early (pre-1950) claims to age 113".
