= Jeremiah Farrell =

American mathematician (1937–2022)

Jeremiah Farrell (December 12, 1937 – July 4, 2022) was an American mathematician and academic who was professor emeritus of mathematics at Butler University in Indiana. He constructed Will Shortz's favorite crossword puzzle, the famous 1996 "Election Day" crossword in The New York Times. He wrote puzzles for various books and newspapers including Scott Kim's puzzle column for Discover magazine.

== Biography ==
Jeremiah Farrell was born in Hastings, Nebraska on December 12, 1937, the oldest of three children to Belle Einsphar and Paul Farrell, a third-generation railroad man. Farrell himself worked for one summer on the railroad, as a "grinder", one who planes down the railroad tracks so they stay smooth. He attended Hastings High School, graduating in 1955, and then the University of Nebraska, graduating in 1963 with degrees in mathematics, chemistry, and physics. He later obtained a master's degree in mathematics, and in 1966 was hired by Butler University, where he worked for the next 40 years, teaching nearly every subject in the mathematics department. He officially retired in 1994 but continued to teach.

Farrell was best known for constructing many crossword puzzles for The New York Times, starting in the 1970s for editor Margaret Farrar and continuing when Will Shortz took over in 1993. In 1996, he designed his most famous puzzle, the "Election Day" crossword. One of the words had the clue "lead story tomorrow", with a 14-letter answer. The puzzle had two correct solutions: "Bob Dole elected" and "Clinton elected", and all the crossing words were designed such that they could be one of two different words, to make either answer work. Shortz called it an "amazing" feat and his favorite puzzle.

With his wife Karen, Farrell helped organize the biannual Gathering for Gardner conferences, which started in 1993 as an invitation-only event for people connected with Martin Gardner.

In 2006 Farrell and his wife took over from A. Ross Eckler Jr. as editors and publishers of the quarterly publication Word Ways: The Journal of Recreational Linguistics, established in 1968.

Farrell died in Indianapolis, Indiana on July 4, 2022, at the age of 84.

== Contributed works ==
- Zen and the Art of Magic Squares
- A.K. Peters publications (where he is called a "mathemagician")
- Discover magazine

== Sources ==
- NYT "Election Day" crossword
- New York Sun, "A Washington Square Park Puzzle Is Solved", May 19–21, 2006
- Indianapolis Star, May 25, 2006, "Butler Prof Figures It Out"
