= Panalphabetic window =

Text containing all letters of the alphabet in order

A panalphabetic window is a stretch of text that contains all the letters of the alphabet in order. It is a special type of pangram or pangrammatic window.

Natural-sounding panalphabetic sentences are not particularly difficult to construct. Poet Howard Bergerson constructed the following 132-letter panalphabetic window:

Well, about porn, I can say definitely that although I loathe junk like that myself, I don't propose to question other people's right to it, because, in my view, if sexy magazines and X-rated movies are what they want instead of the real thing, more power to them!

Considerably rarer are short, naturally occurring panalphabetic windows. Based on the letter frequency distribution of a large corpus, Mike Keith calculated the expected window size for English text to be around 3000 letters. His computer-assisted search of Project Gutenberg identified the shortest natural panalphabetic window as a 535-letter passage from The Alkahest, a translation of Honoré de Balzac's La Recherche de l'Absolu:

Soon, little colloquies followed, a few words said in a low voice behind Emmanuel's back, trifling deceptions which give to a look or a word a meaning whose insidious sweetness may be the cause of innocent mistakes. Relying on his intimacy with Felicie, Pierquin tried to discover the secret of Marguerite's journey, and to know if it were really a question of her marriage, and, whether he must renounce all hope; but, notwithstanding his clumsy cleverness in questioning them, neither Balthazar nor Felicie could give him any light, for the good reason that they were in the dark themselves; Marguerite in taking the reins of power seemed to have followed its maxims and kept silence as to her projects. The gloomy sadness of Balthazar and his great depression made it difficult to get through the evenings.

A shorter 408-letter panalphabetic window was identified by Branden Aldridge in 2018, from Thomas Hart Benton's 1854 autobiography Thirty Years View:

[...] the politicians were to make the panic, by the alarms which they created for the safety of the laws, of the constitution, the public liberty, and the public money: and most zealously did each division of the combination perform its part, and for the long period of three full months. The decision of the resolution condemning General Jackson, on which all this machinery of distress and panic was hung, required no part of that time. There was the same majority to vote it the first day as the last; but the time was wanted to get up the alarm and the distress; and the vote, when taken, was not from any exhaustion of the means of terrifying and agonizing the country, but for the purpose of having the sentence of condemnation ready for the Virginia elections—ready for spreading over Virginia at the approach of the April elections.

== See also ==
- Pangram
- Pangrammatic window
