= Word square =

Words can be read horizontally and vertically

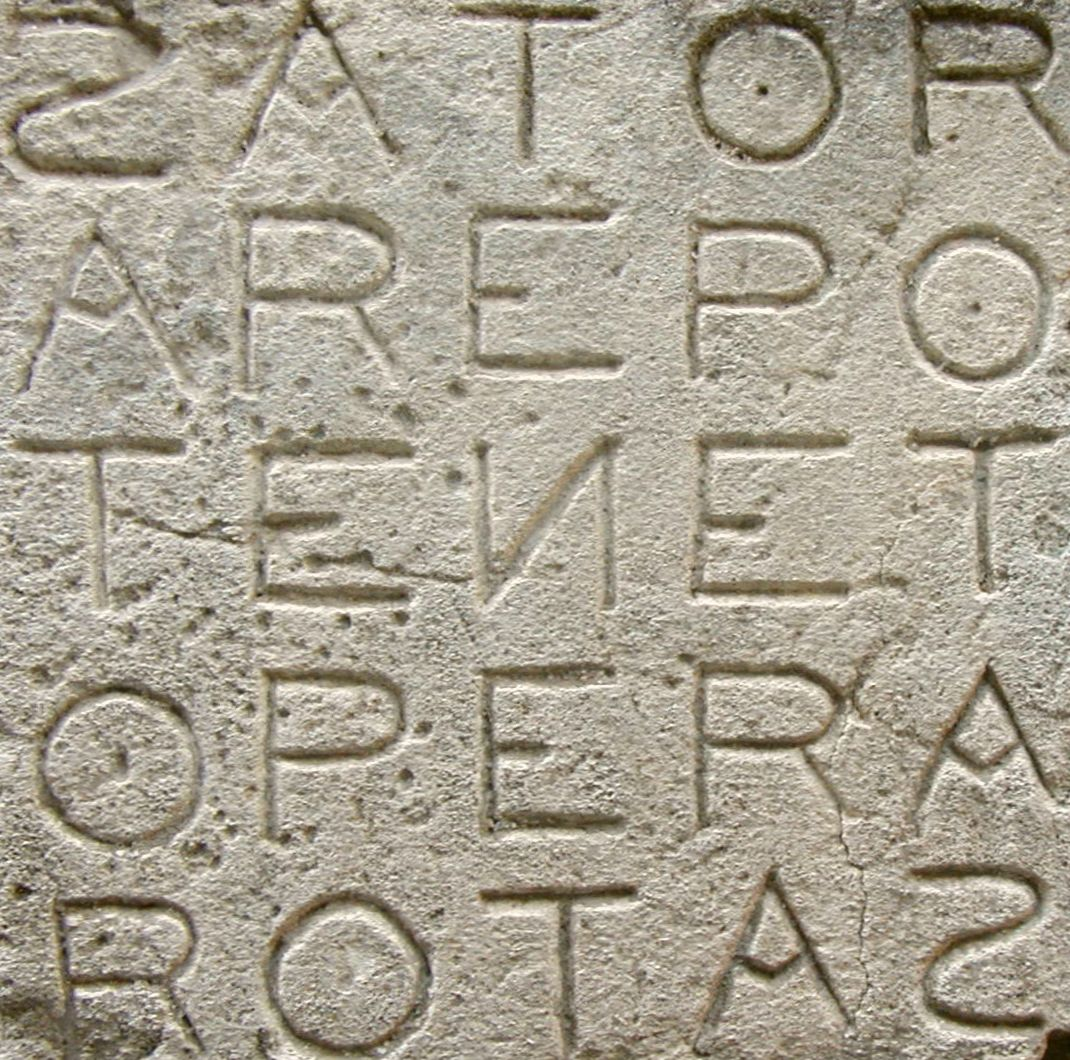
A Sator Square (in SATOR-form), on a wall in the medieval fortress town of Oppède-le-Vieux, France

A word square is a type of acrostic. It consists of a set of words written out in a square grid, such that the same words can be read both horizontally and vertically. The number of words, which is equal to the number of letters in each word, is known as the "order" of the square. For example, this is an order 5 square:

H E A R T
E M B E R
A B U S E
R E S I N
T R E N D

A popular puzzle dating well into ancient times, the word square is sometimes compared to the numerical magic square, though apart from the fact that both use square grids there is no real connection between the two.

== Early history ==
=== Sator Square ===
Lord's Prayer anagram from the 25 letters of the square, including the Alpha and Omega positioning of the residual As and Os.

The first-century Sator Square is a Latin word square, which the Encyclopedia Britannica called "the most familiar lettered square in the Western world".

Its canonical form reads as follows:

S A T O R
A R E P O
T E N E T
O P E R A
R O T A S

In addition to satisfying the basic properties of word squares, it is palindromic; it can be read as a 25-letter palindromic sentence (of an obscure meaning) and it is speculated that it includes several additional hidden words such as reference to the Christian Paternoster prayer, and hidden symbols such as the cross formed by the horizontal and vertical palindromic word "Tenet". The square became a powerful religious and magical symbol in medieval times, and despite over a century of considerable academic study, its origin and meaning are still a source of debate.

=== Abramelin the Mage ===
If the "words" in a word square need not be true words, arbitrarily large squares of pronounceable combinations can be constructed. The following 12×12 array of letters appears in a Hebrew manuscript of The Book of the Sacred Magic of Abramelin the Mage of 1458, said to have been "given by God, and bequeathed by Abraham". An English edition appeared in 1898. This is square 7 of Chapter IX of the Third Book, which is full of incomplete and complete "squares".

I S I C H A D A M I O N
S E R R A R E P I N T O
I R A A S I M E L E I S
C R A T I B A R I N S I
H A S I N A S U O T I R
A R I B A T I N T I R A
D E M A S I C O A N O C
A P E R U N O I B E M I
M I L I O T A B U L E L
I N E N T I N E L E L A
O T I S I R O M E L I R
N O S I R A C I L A R I

No source or explanation is given for any of the "words", so this square does not meet the standards for legitimate word squares. Modern research indicates that a 12-square would be essentially impossible to construct from indexed words and phrases, even using a large number of languages. However, equally large English-language squares consisting of arbitrary phrases containing dictionary words are relatively easy to construct; they too are not considered true word squares, but they have been published in The Enigma and other puzzle magazines as "Something Different" squares.

== Modern English squares ==
A specimen of the order-six square (or 6-square) was first published in English in 1859; the 7-square in 1877; the 8-square in 1884; the 9-square in 1897; and the 10-square in 2023.

Here are examples of English word squares up to order eight:

Table of word squares
A	N O	B I T	C A R D	H E A R T	G A R T E R	B R A V A D O	L A T E R A L S
	O N	I C E	A R E A	E M B E R	A V E R S E	R E N A M E D	A X O N E M A L
		T E N	R E A R	A B U S E	R E C I T E	A N A L O G Y	T O E P L A T E
			D A R T	R E S I N	T R I B A L	V A L U E R S	E N P L A N E D
				T R E N D	E S T A T E	A M O E B A S	R E L A N D E D
					R E E L E D	D E G R A D E	A M A N D I N E
						O D Y S S E Y	L A T E E N E R
							S L E D D E R S

The following is one of several "perfect" nine-squares in English (all words in major dictionaries, uncapitalized, and unpunctuated):

A C H A L A S I A
C R E N I D E N S
H E X A N D R I C
A N A B O L I T E
L I N O L E N I N
A D D L E H E A D
S E R I N E T T E
I N I T I A T O R
A S C E N D E R S

=== Order 10 squares ===
A 10-square is naturally much harder to find, and a "perfect" 10-square in English has been hunted since 1897. It has been called the Holy Grail of logology.

In 2023, Matevž Kovačič from Celje, Slovenia compiled several publicly available dictionaries and large corpora of English texts and developed an algorithm to efficiently enumerate all word squares from large vocabularies, resulting in the first perfect 10-square:

S C A P H A R C A E
C E R R A T E A N A
A R G O L E T I E R
P R O C O L I C I N
H A L O B O R A T E
A T E L O M E R E S
R E T I R E M E N T
C A I C A R E N S E
A N E I T E N S I S
E A R N E S T E S T

The solution, which effectively eliminates the use of capitalized and punctuated words, consists of five binary nomenclature epithets of species names, a term for a type of inorganic compound, a name for a precursor form of an organic compound, as well as a rarely used word, an obsolete word and a standard English word, with the newest word having been introduced in 2011.

Additionally, various methods have produced partial results to the 10-square problem:

Tautonyms

Since 1921, 10-squares have been constructed from reduplicated words and phrases like "Alala! Alala!" (a reduplicated Greek interjection). Each such square contains five words appearing twice, which in effect constitutes four identical 5-squares. Darryl Francis and Dmitri Borgmann succeeded in using near-tautonyms (second- and third-order reduplication) to employ seven different entries by pairing "orangutang" with "urangutang" and "ranga-ranga" with "tanga-tanga", as follows:

O R A N G U T A N G
R A N G A R A N G A
A N D O L A N D O L
N G O T A N G O T A
G A L A N G A L A N
U R A N G U T A N G
T A N G A T A N G A
A N D O L A N D O L
N G O T A N G O T A
G A L A N G A L A N

However, "word researchers have always regarded the tautonymic ten-square as an unsatisfactory solution to the problem."

80% solution

In 1976, Frank Rubin produced an incomplete ten-square containing two nonsense phrases and eight dictionary words:

A C C O M P L I S H
C O O P E R A N C Y
C O P A T E N T E E
O P A L E S C E N T
M E T E N T E R O N
P R E S T A T I O N
L A N C E T O O T H
I N T E R I O R L Y
S C E N O O T L
H Y E T N N H Y

If two words could be found containing the patterns "SCENOOTL" and "HYETNNHY", this would become a complete ten-square.

Fake 11-square

Dmitri Borgmann, in his book Language on Vacation created an 11-square that contains 7 valid words and 4 nonsense phrases:

J X A P M P A H S Z V
X Q N R E R N E E W K
A N T I D O T A L L Y
P R I M I T I V E L Y
M E D I C A M E N T S
P R O T A G O N I S T
A N T I M O N I T E S
H E A V E N I Z I N G
S E L E N I T I C A L
Z W L L T S E N A J Z
V K Y Y S T S G L Z Q

However, the letters in the 2-by-2 squares at the corners can be replaced with anything, since those letters don't appear in any of the actual words.

Constructed vocabulary

From the 1970s, Jeff Grant had a long history of producing well-built squares; concentrating on the ten-square from 1982 to 1985, he produced the first three traditional ten-squares by relying on reasonable coinages such as "Sol Springs" (various extant people named Sol Spring) and "ses tunnels" (French for "its tunnels"). His continuing work produced one of the best of this genre, making use of "impolarity" (found on the Internet) and the plural of "Tony Nader" (found in the white pages), as well as words verified in more traditional references:

D I S T A L I S E D
I M P O L A R I T Y
S P I N A C I N E S
T O N Y N A D E R S
A L A N B R O W N E
L A C A R O L I N A
I R I D O L I N E S
S I N E W I N E S S
E T E R N N E S S E
D Y S S E A S S E S

Personal names

By combining common first and last names and verifying the results in white-pages listings, Steve Root of Westboro, Massachusetts, was able to document the existence of all ten names below (total number of people found is listed after each line):

L E O W A D D E L L 1
E M M A N E E L E Y 1
O M A R G A L V A N 5
W A R R E N L I N D 9
A N G E L H A N N A 2
D E A N H O P P E R 10+
D E L L A P O O L E 3
E L V I N P O O L E 3
L E A N N E L L I S 3
L Y N D A R E E S E 5

Geographic names

Around 2000, Rex Gooch of Letchworth, England, analyzed available wordlists and computing requirements and compiled one or two hundred specialized dictionaries and indexes to provide a reasonably strong vocabulary. The largest source was the United States Board on Geographic Names National Imagery and Mapping Agency. In Word Ways in August and November 2002, he published several squares found in this wordlist. The square below has been held by some word square experts as essentially solving the 10-square problem (Daily Mail, The Times), while others anticipate higher-quality 10-squares in the future.

D E S C E N D A N T
E C H E N E I D A E
S H O R T C O A T S
C E R B E R U L U S
E N T E R O M E R E
N E C R O L A T E R
D I O U M A B A N A
A D A L E T A B A T
N A T U R E N A M E
T E S S E R A T E D

There are a few "imperfections": "Echeneidae" is capitalized, "Dioumabana" and "Adaletabat" are places (in Guinea and Turkey respectively), and "nature-name" is hyphenated.

Many new large word squares and new species have arisen recently. However, modern combinatorics has demonstrated why the 10-square has taken so long to find, and why 11-squares are extremely unlikely to be constructible using English words (even including transliterated place names). However, 11-squares are possible if words from a number of languages are allowed (Word Ways, August 2004 and May 2005).

== Other languages ==
Word squares of various sizes have been constructed in numerous languages other than English, including perfect squares formed exclusively from uncapitalized dictionary words. The only perfect 10-squares published in any language to date have been constructed in Latin and English, and perfect 11-squares have been created in Latin as well. Perfect 9-squares have been constructed in French, while perfect squares of at least order 8 have been constructed in Italian and Spanish. Polyglot 10-squares have also been constructed, each using words from several European languages.

In 2024, Régis Petit published the largest crossword puzzles designed without black squares (12x12, 11x11, 10x10 and 9x9 grids) known in French, English, Italian, Spanish, Latin, Serbian, Croatian, Hungarian and Hebrew ( http://www.regispetit.fr/liensa.htm ).

== Vocabulary ==
It is possible to estimate the size of the vocabulary needed to construct word squares. For example, a 5-square can typically be constructed from as little as a 250-word vocabulary. For each step upwards, one needs roughly four times as many words. For a 9-square, one needs over 60,000 9-letter words, which is practically all of those in single very large dictionaries.

For large squares, the need for a large pool of words prevents one from limiting this set to "desirable" words (i.e. words that are unhyphenated, in common use, without contrived inflections, and uncapitalized), so any resulting word squares are expected to include some exotic words. The opposite problem occurs with small squares: a computer search produces millions of examples, most of which use at least one obscure word. In such cases finding a word square with "desirable" (as described above) words is performed by eliminating the more exotic words or by using a smaller dictionary with only common words. Smaller word squares, used for amusement, are expected to have simple solutions, especially if set as a task for children; but vocabulary in most eight-squares tests the knowledge of an educated adult.

== Variant forms ==
=== Double word squares ===
Word squares that form different words across and down are known as "double word squares". Examples are:

T O O U R N B E E	L A C K I R O N M E R E B A K E	S C E N T C A N O E A R S O N R O U S E F L E E T	A D M I T S D E A D E N S E R E N E O P I A T E R E N T E R B R E E D S

The rows and columns of any double word square can be transposed to form another valid square. For example, the order 4 square above may also be written as:

L I M B
A R E A
C O R K
K N E E

Double word squares are somewhat more difficult to find than ordinary word squares, with the largest known fully legitimate English examples (dictionary words only) being of order 8. Puzzlers.org gives an order 8 example dating from 1953, but this contains six place names. Jeff Grant's example in the February 1992 Word Ways is an improvement, having just two proper nouns ("Aloisias", a plural of the personal name Aloisia, a feminine form of Aloysius, and "Thamnata", a Biblical place-name):

T R A T T L E D
H E M E R I N E
A P O T O M E S
M E T A P O R E
N A I L I N G S
A L O I S I A S
T E N T M A T E
A S S E S S E D

=== Diagonal word squares ===
Diagonal word squares are word squares in which the main diagonals are also words. There are four diagonals: top-left to bottom-right, bottom-right to top-left, top-right to bottom-left, and bottom-left to top-right. In a Single Diagonal Square (same words reading across and down), these last two will need to be identical and palindromic because of symmetry. The 8-square is the largest found with all diagonals: 9-squares exist with some diagonals.

These are examples of diagonal double squares of order 4:

B A R N A R E A L I A R L A D Y	S L A M T I L E E A T S P R O S	T A N S A R E A L I O N L A N D

=== Word rectangles ===
Word rectangles are based on the same idea as double word squares, but the horizontal and vertical words are of a different length. Here are 4×8 and 5×7 examples:

F R A C T U R E O U T L I N E D B L O O M I N G S E P T E T T E	G L A S S E S R E L A P S E I M I T A T E S M E A R E D T A N N E R Y

Again, the rows and columns can be transposed to form another valid rectangle. For example, a 4×8 rectangle can also be written as an 8×4 rectangle.

=== Palindromic squares ===
Palindromic magic squares, like the Sator Square, read the same top-down (and from left to right) and bottom-up (and from right to left). There are no palindromic magic squares of size 5x5 in standard English.

A N N A
N O O N
N O O N
A N N A

P E T S
E D I T
T I D E
S T E P

=== Higher dimensions ===
Word squares can be extended to the third and higher dimensions, such as the word cube and word tesseract below.

K   │I   │N   │G
 I  │ D  │ E  │ A
  N │  E │  T │  S
   G│   A│   S│   H
────┼────┼────┼────
I   │D   │E   │A
 D  │ E  │ A  │ L
  E │  A │  R │  L
   A│   L│   L│   Y
────┼────┼────┼────
N   │E   │T   │S
 E  │ A  │ R  │ L
  T │  R │  I │  O
   S│   L│   O│   P
────┼────┼────┼────
G   │A   │S   │H
 A  │ L  │ L  │ Y
  S │  L │  O │  P
   H│   Y│   P│   E

ALA ROB TWO
AEN TEU ARN
RAA ARM EYE

EAN IBA EAR
SRI YAS RIE
EAS OYE SAW

SON AEA TST
HAE ETH OII
AMP REU SLE

=== Other forms ===
Numerous other shapes have been employed for word-packing under essentially similar rules. The National Puzzlers' League maintains a full list of forms which have been attempted.

== See also ==
- National Puzzlers' League
- Sator Square
