= Hebrew Rehabilitation Center for the Aged =

Senior facility Boston, MA

Hebrew Rehabilitation Center

Geography
- Location: Boston, Massachusetts, United States
- Coordinates: 42.2968°N 71.1311°W

Links
- Lists: Hospitals in Massachusetts

Hebrew Rehabilitation Center is a long-term chronic care hospital in Boston.

They facilitate medical research regarding aging, with results that have been published in the New England Journal of Medicine and covered by The New York Times. One of their departments is named the Center for Social Gerontological Research.

Their research activities facilitated accreditation in 1971 by their state's Educational Facilities Authority of funding via the sale of bonds.
