= Mark Saltveit =

American comedian, writer and palindromist

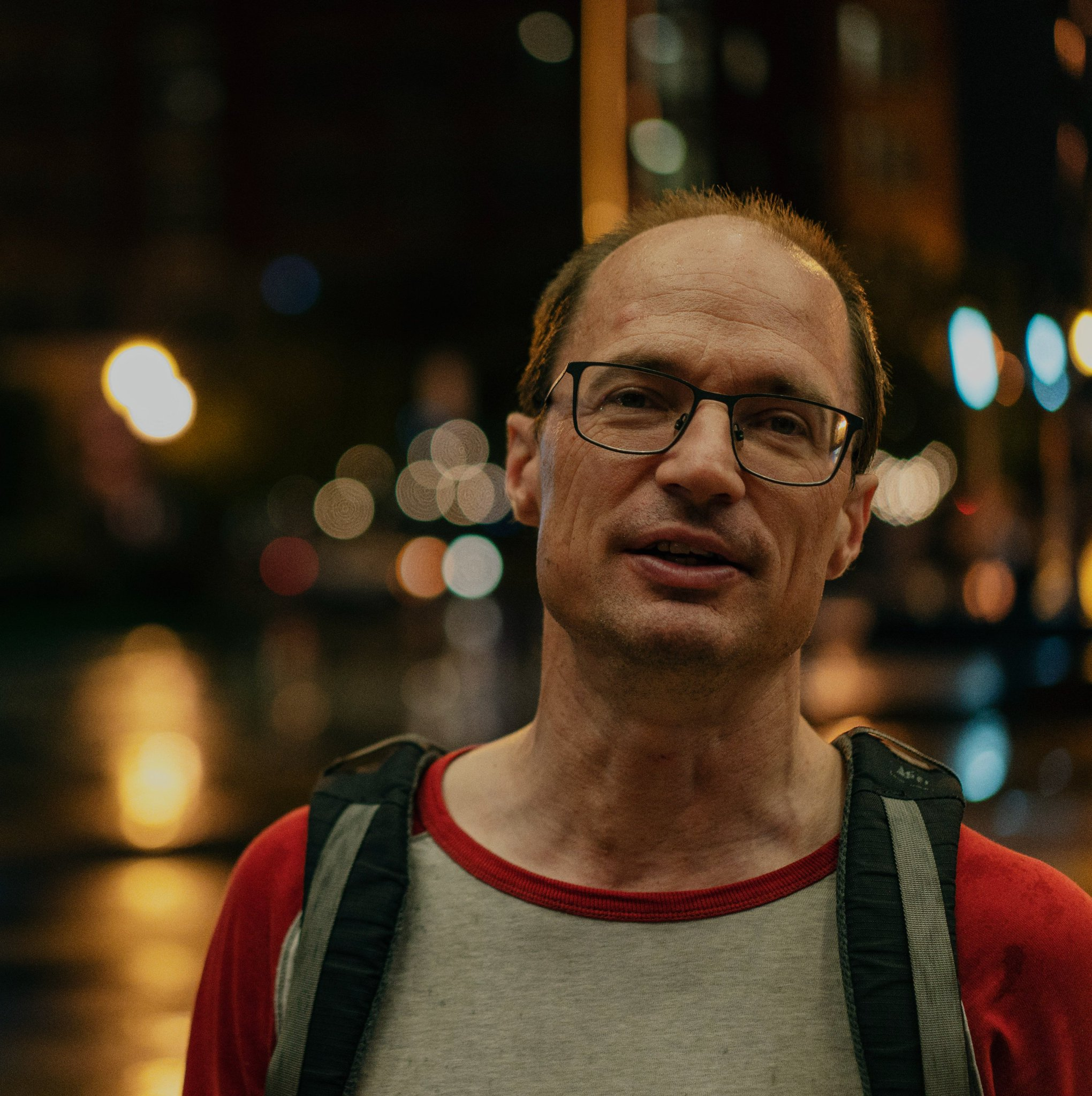
- Born: 1961 (age 64–65)
- Occupations: Stand-up comedian, writer
- Writing career
- Notable work: The Palindromist

Mark Saltveit (born 1961) is a Vermont-based stand-up comedian, palindromist and writer, known for being the first World Palindrome Champion.

Saltveit's interest in wordplay goes back to his childhood, when he and his young brothers would discuss palindromes to stave off boredom during long family road trips. In his 20s, he began composing lengthy palindromes of his own. His first ("Resoled in Saratoga, riveting in a wide wale suit, I use law, Ed. I, wan, ignite virago, tar a snide loser.") is remarkable for its length, but took only a matter of hours to compose.

In 1996, Saltveit founded The Palindromist, a magazine devoted to palindromes and closely related forms of wordplay. He is currently a researcher and lecturer on various forms of wordplay including the tradition of palindromes in Latin and other ancient languages.

On March 16, 2012, Saltveit won the first-ever World Palindrome Championship. The contest, held in Brooklyn before a live audience of 700, was organized by enigmatologist Will Shortz. Saltveit's winning entries beat out those of the six other contestants, including cartoonist Jon Agee and biostatistics professor John Connett. Will Shortz called Saltveit the “king of palindromes.”

Saltveit is the subject of a documentary short, A Man, a Plan, a Palindrome, which premiered at the American Crossword Puzzle Tournament in 2015. The filmmaker, Vince Clemente, planned to produce a feature-length version covering Saltveit's and his fellow contestants' preparations for the World Palindrome Championship in 2017. Saltveit lost that competition to Lori Wike.

== Bibliography ==
- Computer Fun for Everyone: Great Things to Do and Make with Any Computer (with Elin Kordahl Saltveit). Jossey-Bass, 1998 ISBN 0471244503.
- A Man, A Plan ... 2002; The Year in Palindromes. Palindromist Press, 2001. ISBN 9780971871403.
- The Tao of Chip Kelly: Lessons from America's Most Innovative Coach. New York: Diversion Books, 2013. ISBN 978-1-62681-226-0.
- Controlled Chaos: Chip Kelly's Football Revolution.New York: Diversion Books, 2015. ISBN 1626818231.
