= Calyx (magazine) =

- Discipline: Literary journal
- Language: English

Publication details
- History: 1976-present
- Publisher: Calyx, Inc. (United States)
- Frequency: Biannual

Standard abbreviations
- ISO 4: Calyx

Indexing
- ISSN: 0147-1627

Links
- Journal homepage

Calyx: A Journal of Art and Literature by Women is an American literary magazine published in Corvallis, Oregon. The journal was established in 1976 and by 2012 had published the work of some 4,000 female authors. The journal's publishing arm, CALYX Books, has published 40 titles to date. Calyx publishes poetry, creative nonfiction, fiction, art, and reviews.

== Publication history ==
Calyx was the collective vision of four women in Corvallis, Oregon that attempts to discover emerging writers—including work by women of color, young and old women, lesbian and bisexual women, cisgender and transgender women, and non-binary and genderfluid people.

Established in 1976, Calyx is a bi-annual publication. It is one of the only surviving community-based periodicals from the women's liberation movement, along with Sinister Wisdom.

== Notable contributors ==
- Ursula K. Le Guin
- Barbara Kingsolver
- Chimamanda Ngozi Adichie
- Julia Alvarez
- Natalie Goldberg
- Sharon Olds
