= Homer Screws =

American soccer player and coach

Personal information
- Date of birth: August 31, 1966 (age 60)
- Place of birth: Tacoma Washington, U.S.
- Position: Defender

College career
Years	Team	Apps	(Gls)
- Warner Pacific Knights

Senior career*
Years	Team	Apps	(Gls)
1987–1988	F.C. Portland		
1987–1989	Tacoma Stars (indoor)	44	(1)
1989–1990	Atlanta Attack (indoor)		

Managerial career
- 1993–1998: Coe College (men)
- 2007–: Coe College (men)
- 2007–: Coe College (women)
- * Club domestic league appearances and goals

Homer Screws (born August 31, 1966) is an American retired soccer defender who played professionally in the Major Indoor Soccer League, Western Soccer Alliance and American Indoor Soccer Association. He coached the Coe College men's and women's soccer teams.

== Player ==
After graduating from high school, Screws spent a year playing lower division soccer in Germany. He returned to the United States and played at least one season of collegiate soccer at Warner Pacific College. In 1987 and 1988, Screws played for F.C. Portland in the Western Soccer Alliance. In the fall of 1987, Screws signed with the Tacoma Stars of the Major Indoor Soccer League. He spent two seasons with the Stars, but lost most of his second season with injuries. In 1989, he moved to the Atlanta Attack of the American Indoor Soccer Association. In January 1990, the Attack placed Screws on the disabled list. He retired at the end of the season and moved back to Tacoma with his family.

== Coach ==
In 1991, Screws and his wife decided to leave Tacoma due to a rising crime rate and move to Iowa where he became a youth soccer coach. This brought him to the attention of Coe College of Cedar Rapids, Iowa which Screws in 1993 as head coach of its men's soccer team. In 2007, Screws returned to Coe College as both the men's and women's soccer coach.
