= Spinning newspaper =

Scene transition

A spinning newspaper is a film transition device. At the conclusion of a scene or act, an image of a rapidly spinning newspaper is displayed. The newspaper stops spinning to reveal a headline that reflects what happened between the preceding and subsequent segments of the film story, preparing the audience for what follows. It may be accompanied by other similar tropes, such as a newsboy declaring "Extra, extra, read all about it," or a stack of newspapers being thrown to a street vendor from a delivery truck, and then shown in close-up.

Many B movies of the 1940s, 50s, and 60s utilized the spinning newspaper effect to narrate important plot points that occurred offscreen. The effect necessitated the appearance of a realistic front page, which consisted of a main headline relevant to the plot, and several smaller headlines used as filler. A large number of these spinning newspapers included stories titled "New Petitions Against Tax" and "Building Code Under Fire." These phrases have become running jokes among B movie fans.
