= Pangrammatic window =

Text containing all letters of the alphabet

A pangrammatic window is a stretch of naturally occurring text that contains all the letters in the alphabet.

== Shortest examples ==
The shortest known naturally occurring pangrammatic window was discovered in October 2014 through an automated processing of Google's indexed webcorpus, found in a review of the movie Magnolia written by Todd Manlow on the website PopMatters, at 36 letters:

Further, fractal geometries are replicated on a human level in the production of certain “types” of subjectivity: for example, aging kid quiz show whiz Donnie Smith (William H. Macy) and up and coming kid quiz show whiz Stanley Spector (Jeremy Blackman) are connected (or, perhaps, being cloned) in ways they couldn’t possibly imagine.

The shortest known window in a published work is found in Piers Anthony's book Cube Route, at 42 letters:

We are all from Xanth," Cube said quickly. "Just visiting Phaze. We just want to find the dragon." at 42 letters occurring on page 98 of the 2004 First Mass Market Edition published by Tor.

Prior to that, the shortest known window in a published work was found in Lillie de Hegermann-Lindencrone's 1912 book In the Courts of Memory, at 56 letters:

I sang, and thought I sang very well; but he just looked up into my face with a very quizzical expression, and said, 'How long have you been singing, Mademoiselle?'

== Probability of occurrence ==
Generally, according to the law of probability, the shorter the work, the longer the minimal pangrammatic window (if any) will be.

Some estimates can be made using the frequencies of the letters. Assuming that the incidence of each letter in a passage is independent of the incidence of the other letters, and provided m is much larger than 26, the probability that a sequence of length m will contain all 26 letters is approximately P(a)P(b)...P(y)P(z), where P(letter) = 1 − (1 − p(letter))^{m} and p(letter) is the frequency of the letter as a fraction (e.g. 5% is 0.05). Inputting the letter frequencies for the English language, the probability that a 1,700-letter sequence will contain all 26 letters is about 50%. At 1,000, there is about a 19.5% chance, and at 2,500, there is about a 73% chance.

For example, the shortest pangrammatic window in Around the World in Eighty Days, by Jules Verne, is 150 letters:

"If I am not mistaken," said he, approaching this person, with his most amiable smile, "you are the gentleman who so kindly volunteered to guide me at Suez?"

"Ah! I quite recognise you. You are the servant of the strange Englishman--"

"Just so, monsieur--"

"Fix."

"Monsieur Fix," resumed Passepartout, "I'm charmed to find you on board. Where are you bound?"

"Like you, to Bombay."

The shortest pangrammatic window in the United States Declaration of Independence, a significantly shorter work, is 592 letters:

We hold these truths to be self-evident, that all men are created equal, that they are endowed by their Creator with certain unalienable Rights, that among these are Life, Liberty and the pursuit of Happiness.—That to secure these rights, Governments are instituted among Men, deriving their just powers from the consent of the governed,—That whenever any Form of Government becomes destructive of these ends, it is the Right of the People to alter or to abolish it, and to institute new Government, laying its foundation on such principles and organizing its powers in such form, as to them shall seem most likely to effect their Safety and Happiness. Prudence, indeed, will dictate that Governments long established should not be changed for light and transient causes; and accordingly all experience hath shewn, that mankind are more disposed to suffer, while evils are sufferable, than to right themselves by abolishing the forms to which they are accustomed.

== See also ==
- Panalphabetic window
- Pangram
