= Thumbscrew =

Thumbscrew can mean:

- Thumbscrew (torture), a screwed device formerly used for torture
- Thumbscrew (fastener), a type of screw with a tall head and ridged or knurled sides, or a flat vertical head, intended to be tightened and loosened by hand

== See also ==
- Computer case screws
- Wingnut (hardware), a nut with two large metal wings on, intended to be tightened and loosened by hand
