= Language on Vacation =

1965 book by Dmitri Borgmann

Language on Vacation: An Olio of Orthographical Oddities
- Author: Dmitri Borgmann
- Language: English
- Published: 1965
- Publisher: Charles Scribner's Sons
- Publication place: United States
- Media type: Print
- Pages: 318
- OCLC: 8478220
- Followed by: Beyond Language: Adventures in Word and Thought

Language on Vacation: An Olio of Orthographical Oddities is a 1965 book written by Dmitri Borgmann.

== Content ==
Borgmann introduces his book by stating that he hopes it will "elevate recreational linguistics to the same high level of esteem now enjoyed by recreational mathematics" and will cultivate in the reader an awareness of the beauty of words. Chapter by chapter, the book goes on to describe and provide examples of long-established forms of letter-play, such as palindromes and reversals, antigrams, anagrams, pangrams, transpositions, and word squares. Also included are chapters on word-level phenomena, such as sentence palindromes, and wordplay involving arithmetic and geometric progressions. Piphilology and various methods of encoding the digits of pi into word mnemonics are also discussed.

== Reception and legacy ==
On publication the book attracted favourable reviews, with Time calling it "one of the year's most peculiar and fascinating books", Kirkus Reviews summarizing it as "intellectual busy work which is fine entertainment", and Scientific American's James R. Newman's lauding it as "the best, most comprehensive book ever written on… recreational linguistics". Later writers have come to regard the book as "groundbreaking", noting that it was the first book devoted solely to the description and study of wordplay, rather than simply providing a list of puzzles.

The book is notable for having introduced and popularized the use of the word logology to mean recreational linguistics, or the study and practice of wordplay. Borgmann has since been referred to as the "Father of Logology" and his book is credited with ushering in a "golden age of wordplay". The book's publicity led to Borgmann being contracted by industrial design firm Loewy & Snaith to invent brand names for its client Standard Oil, and to Greenwood Periodicals selecting him to establish and edit their logology journal, Word Ways.

== Production history ==
Language on Vacation was published in 1965 by Charles Scribner's Sons; recreational mathematician Joseph Madachy served as the author's literary agent. The book went through at least two printings, but as of 2005 it was out of print. The manuscript Borgmann originally submitted contained two additional chapters, on word play involving phonetics and semantics, which were rejected by the publisher. Some of this material was recycled for Borgmann's second book, Beyond Language: Adventures in Word and Thought, and other topics were worked into Word Ways articles.
