= Kim Stafford =

American poet

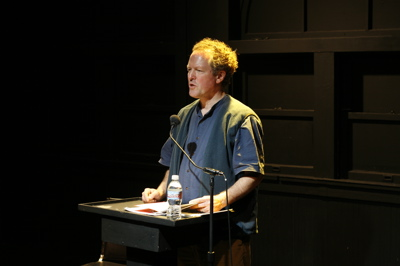
- Born: Kim Robert Stafford; October 15, 1949 (age 76); Portland, Oregon
- Education: University of Oregon (BA, MA, PhD)
- Relatives: William Stafford (father)

9th Oregon Poet Laureate
- In office 2018–2020
- Governor: Kate Brown
- Preceded by: Elizabeth Woody
- Succeeded by: Anis Mojgani

Kim Robert Stafford (born October 15, 1949) is an American poet and essayist who lives in Portland, Oregon.

== Early life and education ==
Born and raised in Portland, Oregon, Stafford is the son of poet William Stafford. He earned a Bachelor of Arts, Master of Arts in English, and Ph.D. in medieval literature from the University of Oregon.

== Career ==
Since 1979, he has taught writing at Lewis & Clark College in Portland. He has also taught courses at Willamette University in Salem, at the Sitka Center for Art and Ecology, at the Fishtrap writers' gathering, and private workshops in Scotland, Italy, and Bhutan.

In July 2018, he was appointed the 9th Oregon Poet Laureate by Governor Kate Brown. He served in the role until 2020.

He is the founding director of the Northwest Writing Institute and is the literary executor of the Estate of William Stafford.
