= Ethel Romig Fuller =

American poet

Ethel R. Fuller
- Born: Ethel Romig; February 26, 1883; Big Rapids, Michigan, U.S.
- Died: December 13, 1965 (aged 82); Portland, Oregon, U.S.
- Occupation: Poet
- Spouse: Charles Fuller
- Writing career
- Period: 1931–1965

Ethel Romig Fuller (February 26, 1883 – December 13, 1965) was Oregon's third Poet Laureate (1957–1965), and the state's first female Poet Laureate. She was also editor of The Oregonian's poetry section from the early 1930s to the late 1950s.

== Early life and education ==
Fuller was born in Big Rapids, Michigan, on February 26, 1883, and attended the Eastern Michigan Normal School.

After visiting Oregon on vacation, she moved to Portland, Oregon, in 1906 and attended the Portland Extension Center. After climbing Mount Hood, she dedicated herself to writing about the Northwest.

== Poet and editor ==
Fuller began writing poetry in the early 1920s.

When Fuller found out that the Oregonian was going to discontinue publishing poetry in early 1930s, she complained to the editor, and was then hired to start the poetry column, which published poets from around the world. She wrote three published collections of her poetry, as well as lectured and read poetry on the radio. Fuller was known for helping and encouraging new poets.

== Recognition ==
The New York Times called her New Verse poem "Proof?", which had originally been published in 1927 in Sunset magazine, “the most quoted poem in contemporary English literature" because it had been reprinted so widely.

Oregon Governor Robert D. Holmes nominated her as Oregon's third Poet Laureate in 1957.

== Personal life ==
Fuller was married to Charles Fuller, an insurance salesman. She lived in both Oregon and Washington. She died December 13, 1965.

== Bibliography ==
- White Peaks and Green
- Kitchen Sonnets (and Lyrics of Domesticity)
- Skylines
