= Dmitri Borgmann =

German-American author and logologist (1927–1985)

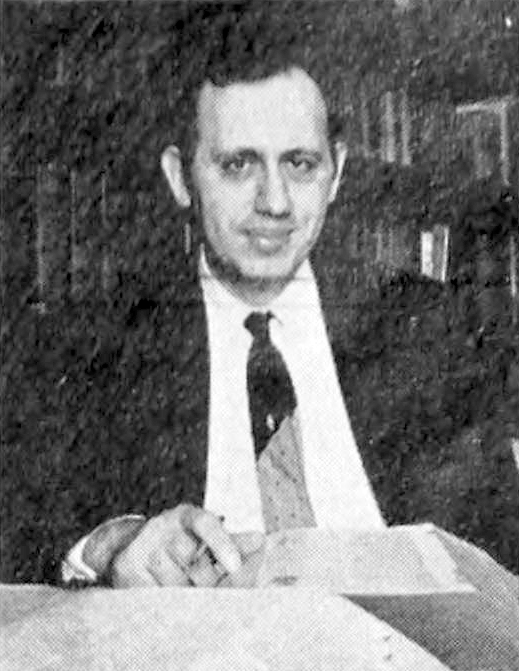
- Borgmann in a 1964 portrait by Jeff Lowenthal
- Born: Dmitri Alfred Borgmann; October 22, 1927; Berlin, Weimar Republic
- Died: December 7, 1985 (aged 58); Dayton, Washington, U.S.
- Known for: Logology

Dmitri Alfred Borgmann (October 22, 1927 – December 7, 1985) was a German-American author best known for his work in recreational linguistics.

== Early life ==
Borgmann was born on October 22, 1927, in Berlin, Germany, to Hans and Lisa Borgmann. Fearing that the Nazi government would discover Lisa's Jewish ancestry, the family fled to the United States in 1936, and settled in Chicago. Borgmann graduated from the University of Chicago in 1946 and found work as an actuary. In 1964 he quit his job to focus on his writing. In 1971, he started his own research and manuscript writing business, INTELLEX, which employed up to 15 writers at a time to ghost-write and edit short stories, academic books, and TV and movie scripts. Borgmann eventually relocated the company and his family to Dayton, Washington.

== Writing career ==
Borgmann first attracted media attention for his skill with words in 1958, when over the course of eight weeks he defeated 22 challengers in a row on WGN-TV's It's In The Name, winning nearly $3,800. Around this time he also started contributing word puzzles and trivia to "Line o' Type or Two", a column in the Chicago Tribune. Much of this material was mined from back issues of The Enigma, the official journal of the National Puzzlers' League which he had joined in 1956. By 1964, he had established himself as "the country's leading authority on word play", a designation he continued to hold up until the time of his death.

His first book, Language on Vacation: An Olio of Orthographical Oddities, was published by Scribner's in 1965, and received critical acclaim from major magazines and literary journals, including Time and Scientific American. Today it is best remembered for popularizing the word logology to refer to the field of recreational linguistics; Borgmann himself is often referred to now as the "Father of Logology".

The publicity generated by Language on Vacation led to Borgmann being contracted by industrial design firm Loewy & Snaith to invent brand names for their clients. For this work he is widely cited as the creator of "Exxon", which Standard Oil adopted as its new name after paying Borgmann a $10,000 fee. At $2,000 per letter, commentators joked that this made Borgmann the most highly paid writer in history. Language on Vacation also attracted the attention of puzzle author Martin Gardner, who in 1967 recommended Borgmann as the editor for Greenwood Periodicals's new magazine Word Ways: The Journal of Recreational Linguistics. Borgmann edited the magazine for its inaugural year, but resigned after Greenwood refused to meet his salary demands. When Greenwood appointed fellow logologist Howard W. Bergerson to succeed him as editor-in-chief, Borgmann refused to ever speak to him again.

A follow-up to Language on Vacation, entitled Beyond Language: Adventures in Word and Thought, was published in 1967; it was less successful but still attracted favorable reviews. Borgmann also edited and annotated a book on crossword puzzles, 1970's Curious Crosswords. Throughout the 1960s, 1970s, and 1980s, he was a regular writer for the Chicago Tribune, Games, and Puzzle Lovers Newspaper, and continued to contribute articles to Word Ways. (Much of this writing was published under pseudonyms, including El Uqsor, Jezebel Q. XIXX, Ramona J. Quincunx, and Prof. Merlin X. Houdini.) He also sponsored "Jackpot Jubilee", a series of word contests.

== Later life and death ==
In the late 1970s, Borgmann founded a new religious movement, the Divine Immortality Church, and took out ads in New Times, The Atlantic, Mother Jones and other magazines, offering ordainment certificates and divinity degrees. He also advertised the church in Hustler, encouraging the publisher to omit the first T in "Immortality". As many as a hundred people joined the movement.

Borgmann had a reputation for being reclusive to the point of eccentricity, a characteristic which intensified in his later years. None of his colleagues from publishing—not even his literary agent Joseph Madachy, nor Martin Gardner, who got Borgmann the editorship of Word Ways—ever met him personally. His successors at Word Ways, Howard W. Bergerson and A. Ross Eckler, Jr., never met him either. Borgmann's home life was even more secluded; most external and internal windows were boarded up or covered with heavy drapes, and mirrors were not permitted in the house. Borgmann rarely left his cluttered upstairs room, sometimes working secretively for weeks without seeing his family. Though he was diagnosed with a heart condition, he refused to take his prescribed medication, and eventually succumbed to a heart attack on December 7, 1985, at the age of 58. He was survived by his wife of 23 years, Iris Sterling, and their two sons, Mark and Keith.

After his death, Eckler and Borgmann's son Keith went through his papers, finding material for a number of articles which were published posthumously in Word Ways. The Special Collections and University Archives of the Stanford University Libraries has collected and preserved correspondence between Borgmann and Martin Gardner, dating from 1956 to the 1980s, across 19 folders of its Martin Gardner Papers.

== Bibliography ==
- Borgmann, Dmitri A. (1965). Language on Vacation: An Olio of Orthographical Oddities. New York: Charles Scribner's Sons. OCLC 8478220.
- Borgmann, Dmitri A. (1967). Beyond Language: Adventures in Word and Thought. New York: Charles Scribner's Sons. OCLC 655067975.
- Borgmann, Dmitri A., ed. (1970). Curious Crosswords. New York: Charles Scribner's Sons.
