= A. Ross Eckler Jr. =

American mathematician (1927–2016)

- Born: Albert Ross Eckler Jr. August 29, 1927; Boston, Massachusetts, US
- Died: December 9, 2016 (aged 89); New Jersey, US
- Occupations: statistician; logologist; centenarian researcher
- Parent: A. Ross Eckler

Albert Ross Eckler Jr. (August 29, 1927 – December 9, 2016) was an American logologist, statistician, and author, the son of statistician A. Ross Eckler. He served in the US Army from 1946 – 1947. He received a BA from Swarthmore College with High Honors in 1950 and a PhD in mathematics from Princeton University in 1954.

== Biography ==
While at Bell Labs (1954–1984), Eckler co-authored Mathematical Models of Target Coverage and Missile Allocation with Stefan A. Burr.

Eckler was the publisher and editor of Word Ways: The Journal of Recreational Linguistics. In 1996 he published a book on logology entitled Making the Alphabet Dance. Recreational Wordplay.

He was also the author of The National Puzzlers' League, The First 115 Years, a history of the National Puzzlers' League (NPL). He and his wife Faith were married for more than 50 years, and were former NPL editors under the collective pen name "Faro" (with variant forms "FAro" for Faith and "faRO" for Ross).

Eckler's hobbies were genealogy and supercentenarian research. Eckler disproved exaggerated age claims such as those of Charlie Smith and George Fruits while authenticating others such as Delina Filkins (1815–1928). He was an avid hiker, leading hikes for the Appalachian Mountain Club between 1978 and 1997, a member (and trail maintainer) of the New York–New Jersey Trail Conference and researched portions of the Lawrence Line starting in 1996. He was also an active recreational caver starting in 1952; he joined the National Speleological Society in 1957, and became a life member in 1962. From 1963 to 1965 was editor of Speleo-Themes, the Northern NJ Grotto publication. He served as the carillonneur at St. Peter's Episcopal Church in Morristown, New Jersey from 1964 to 1988 and was a member of The Guild of Carillonneurs in North America.

He died on December 9, 2016, at the age of 89.

== Works ==
- Eckler, A. Ross Jr. (1970). The Eckler-Ackler-Ackley Family (Genealogy).
- Eckler, A. Ross Jr. (1996). Making the Alphabet Dance: Recreational Wordplay. New York: St. Martin's Press. ISBN 9780312155803.
- Eckler, A. Ross Jr. (1997). Three Pioneers of Stark (Jacob Bronner, John Fetterly, John Shaul and their Descendants).
- Eckler, A. Ross Jr. (1998). The National Puzzler's League - The First 115 Years.

== See also ==
- Logology
- National Puzzlers' League
- Word Ways: The Journal of Recreational Linguistics
