= Word Ways =

Magazine on recreational linguistics, logology and word play

- Cover of the November 2013 issue
- Editor: Jeremiah Farrell
- Categories: Recreational linguistics
- Frequency: Quarterly
- Publisher: Greenwood Periodicals (1968–1969); A. Ross Eckler Jr. (1970–2006); Jeremiah Farrell (2007–)
- First issue: 1968
- Country: USA
- Based in: Indianapolis, Indiana
- Website: digitalcommons.butler.edu/wordways/
- ISSN: 0043-7980
- OCLC: 1604435

Word Ways: The Journal of Recreational Linguistics is a quarterly magazine on recreational linguistics, logology and word play. It was established by Dmitri Borgmann in 1968 at the behest of Martin Gardner. Howard Bergerson took over as editor-in-chief for 1969, but stepped down when Greenwood Periodicals dropped the publication. A. Ross Eckler Jr., a statistician at Bell Labs, became editor until 2006, when he was succeeded by Jeremiah Farrell (Butler University).

Word Ways was the first periodical devoted exclusively to word play, and has become the foremost publication in that field. Lying "on the midpoint of a spectrum from popular magazine to scholarly journal", it publishes articles on various linguistic oddities and creative use of language. This includes research into and demonstrations of anagrams, pangrams, lipograms, tautonyms, univocalics, word ladders, palindromes and unusually long words, as well as book reviews, literature surveys, investigations into questionable logological claims, puzzles and quizzes, mnemonics and a small measure of linguistically oriented fiction.

Willard R. Espy discovered Word Ways in 1972, and eventually used material from several dozen articles in his Almanac of Words at Play anthologies. The first of these included complete subscription details for Word Ways, which generated so many inquiries that for decades the publishers were reluctant to change their address.

In the November 2020 issue, editor Jeremiah Farrell announced that the publication of Word Ways would be suspended, but will hopefully resume in the future.

== Current editorial board ==
- Editor: Jeremiah Farrell, Butler University
- Lacey Echols, Butler University
- Kirstin L. Ellsworth, South Pasadena, California
- Barbara Howes, Butler University
- Katie Mohr, Wiley Publishing Company
- David D. Wright, Hangzhou, China
- Electronic Journal Publishing Assistant: Laina Ridenour, Butler University

== See also ==
- Dave Morice, former editor
