= Anthony Etherin =

British experimental poet

Anthony Etherin (born 2 September 1981) is a British experimental formal poet and publisher for the imprint Penteract Press. He is known for his use of strict, often combinatorial, literary restrictions, most notably palindromes, anagrams, and aelindromes, a restriction of his own invention. He also composes constraint-based music, and hosted The Penteract Podcast.

Etherin seeks to promote literary constraints as poetic tools rather than just word games, and sees constraints as part of the same tradition as fixed poetry forms, saying that palindromes “possess innate poetic value, in the elegance of their abstract symmetry.”

== Work ==
=== Twitter ===
Etherin is known for his prolific use of Twitter, where he posts poems daily. These poems include award-winning palindromes, anagrammed lines poems, and minimalist sonnets composed in iambic monometer and dimeter. He has occasionally tweets triolets, a form for which has expressed a particular fondness.

In August 2018, a palindrome of Etherin's went viral, following a retweet from children's author JK Rowling. The tweet was a rare topical palindrome by Etherin, addressing rumours that actor Idris Elba would be the next James Bond (‘Able Sir, did nobody fit recognise it ties in? Go, certify—do Bond, Idris Elba!’). More typically, Etherin's palindromes avoid proper names and cultural references (‘I sat, solemn. I saw time open one poem. It was in me, lost as I.’).

=== Penteract Press ===
Etherin founded Penteract Press in July 2016, as a venue for experimental formal poetry, particularly constraint-based and visual poetry. Initially operating as a leaflet micro-press, by 2018 Penteract Press was producing full-length poetry books and chapbooks. Penteract Press has published work by such international avant-garde poets as Christian Bök, Gary Barwin, Nick Montfort, Steven J Fowler, Gregory Betts, derek beaulieu, rob mclennan, and Samuel Andreyev.

In April 2019, Penteract Press was invited by Gregory Betts to host a roundtable discussion on the subject of micro-press publishing at the conference TEXT/SOUND/PERFORMANCE: Making in Canadian Space held at University College Dublin.

In 2020, Etherin started hosting The Penteract Poetry Podcast, a series of interviews with poets and poetry publishers.

=== Stray Arts ===
In October 2019, Etherin published his book Stray Arts (and Other Inventions) through Penteract Press. Ten years in the making, the book is a collection of Etherin's most adventurous and extreme experiments in constraint-based formalism, presenting anagrams and palindromes in combination with traditional forms such as sonnets, sestinas, triolets, and ottava rima. Stray Arts also features experiments in visual poetry and a number of the smaller poems featured on his Twitter account.

The book received blurbs from poets Christian Bök and Ian McMillan, as well as magician Penn Jillette, who had previously referred to Etherin's poem-pair The White Whale as a ‘perfect work of art’. (The White Whale consists of two palindromes (one palindromic by pairs of letters) that are perfect anagrams of each other and which both discuss Herman Melville’s novel Moby-Dick). T. S. Eliot Prize winner George Szirtes said of Stray Arts' poems: "They don't really belong in the realms of concrete poetry or of DADA. They are clearly moving towards coherence, as if each poem were the work of a dozen spiders constructing one complex web for the light to catch."

=== Slate Petals ===
In July 2021, Penteract Press published Slate Petals (and Other Wordscapes), Etherin's follow-up to 2019's Stray Arts. Applying the methods of its prequel to pastoral subject matter, Slate Petals explores the use of strict constraints to compose traditional lyrical poetry.

Slate Petals received blurbs from Anthony Horowitz, George Szirtes, and Christian Bök and was launched online via The Penteract Podcast, owing to the ongoing COVID-19 pandemic. Praising the book, magician Penn Jillette read excerpts from Slate Petals on his podcast, while poet and broadcaster Ian McMillan wrote of it, "Anthony Etherin is the true king of the jewels to be found in restricted language and I’ve really been enjoying his brilliant new collection… Anthony mines language to come up with things that are breathtaking and almost beyond meaning."

=== The Robots of Babylon ===
In October 2023, Penteract Press published The Robots of Babylon, Etherin's third full-length collection. Inspired by twentieth-century pulp fiction tropes, The Robots of Babylon presents several new literary constraints, including the slice and aelindivider. It also features Etherin’s first published works of alliterative verse. The book received blurbs from Jane Espenson and David Astle.

=== Knit Ink ===
An omnibus edition of Etherin’s work, Knit Ink (and Other Poems) was published by Deep Vellum in late 2024.

=== Aelindromes ===
Probably Etherin's biggest stylistic innovation is the aelindrome, a constraint that divides letters up according to numerical sequences. Etherin invented the restriction in 2012, after he saw the potential of composing palindromes by pairs of letters (the earliest palindrome-by-pairs was a tribute to Albert Einstein, ‘Intense ion, Einstein!’). They have been described as an "even more fiendish" constraint than palindromes and anagrams.

An aelindrome divides its letters by varying the number of letters by which it is a palindrome. For example, the line ‘melody, a bloody elm’ is aelindromic in 1-2-3-4, because the letter units are cut up as follows: 1(m) — 2(el) — 3(ody) — 4(ablo) before being reversed around their pivot. Etherin describes the Aelindrome thusly: “In an aelindrome, the unit is changing constantly according to a premeditated numerical palindrome.” Etherin's book Stray Arts includes aelindromes that use the first twenty digits of famous irrational numbers, such as pi, Euler's Number, and the golden ratio.

== Books and chapbooks ==
- Cellar (Penteract Press, 2018) ISBN 9781999870201
- Danse Macabre (above/ground press, 2018)
- Quartets (Penteract Press, 2019)
- Otherworld (no press, 2019)
- Stray Arts (and Other Inventions) (Penteract Press, 2019) ISBN 9781999870263
- Thaumaturgy (above/ground press, 2020)
- The Utu Sonnets (Penteract Press, 2021) ISBN 9781913421137
- Slate Petals (and Other Wordscapes) (Penteract Press, 2021) ISBN 9781913421106
- The Noson Sonnets (Penteract Press, 2022) ISBN 9781913421212
- The Robots of Babylon (Penteract Press, 2023) ISBN 9781913421434
- Knit Ink (and Other Poems) (Deep Vellum, 2024) ISBN 9781646053452
