= Poodle Hat =

Studio album by "Weird Al" Yankovic
- Released: May 20, 2003
- Recorded: March 25, 2002–March 21, 2003
- Studios: Mad Dog (Burbank); EMG (North Hollywood)
- Genres: Comedy, parody
- Length: 54:38
- Labels: Volcano; Way Moby
- Producer: "Weird Al" Yankovic

"Weird Al" Yankovic chronology
Running with Scissors (1999)	Poodle Hat (2003)	Straight Outta Lynwood (2006)

Poodle Hat is the eleventh studio album by the American parody musician "Weird Al" Yankovic, released on May 20, 2003. It was the fifth studio album self-produced by Yankovic. Its musical styles are built around parodies and pastiches of pop of the early 2000s. The album's lead single, "Couch Potato", a parody of "Lose Yourself" by Eminem, failed to chart. Four years later, the album's song "eBay", a parody of "I Want It That Way" by Backstreet Boys, reached 15 on the Bubbling Under Hot 100 Singles.

The album includes five parodies: "Couch Potato", "eBay", and spoofs of "Hot in Herre" by Nelly, "Complicated" by Avril Lavigne, and "Piano Man" by Billy Joel. The album includes six original songs, several of which parody not a song but the styles of Ben Folds, Beck, and Frank Zappa. A polka medley of popular songs also appears on the album. A music video for the song "Couch Potato" was planned but was cancelled after Eminem objected.

Poodle Hat was released as an Enhanced CD, meaning that when the disc is placed in a computer, bonus content (including alternate song mixes, short videos, and photo galleries) is viewable. The album met with mixed reviews from critics; some felt that the album represented an artistic misstep for Yankovic, whereas others enjoyed its skewering of early 2000s popular culture. The album peaked at number 17 on the Billboard 200. It was the first of Yankovic's albums to make the Billboard Comedy Albums chart, where it peaked at number 12.

== Production ==
=== Originals ===
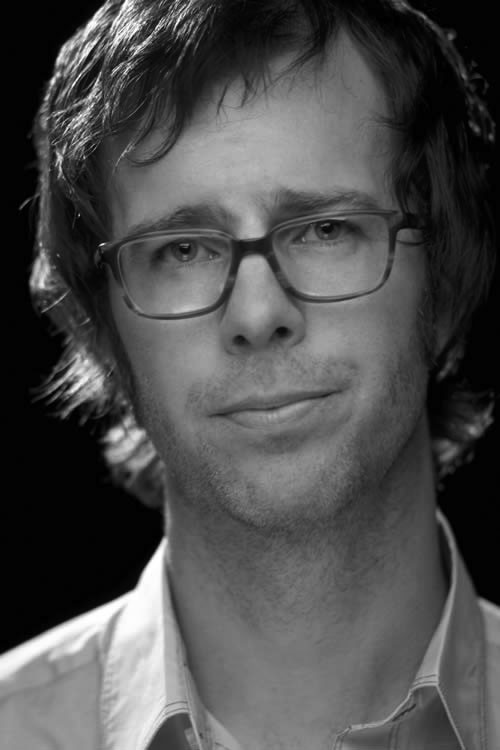
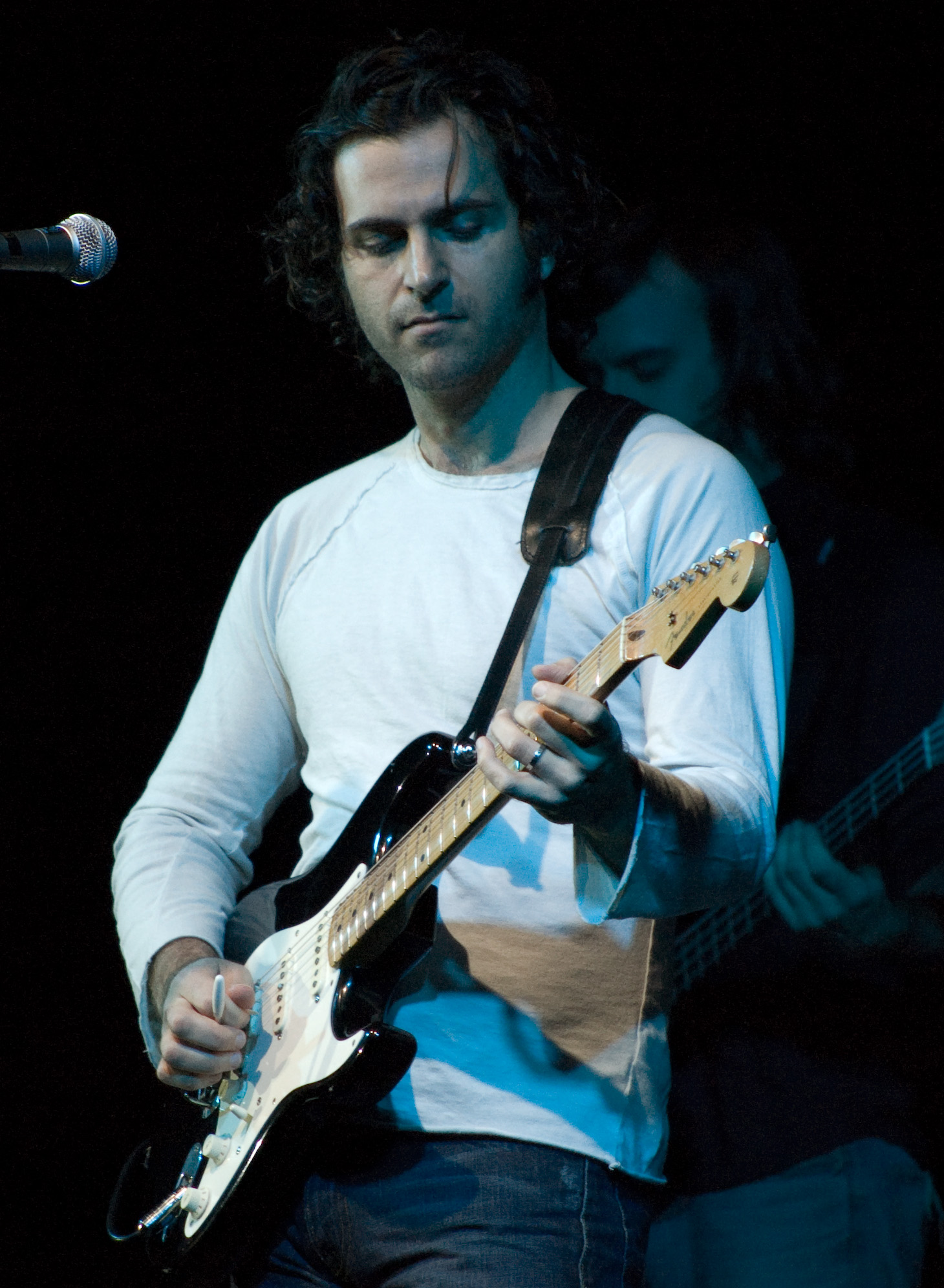
Both Ben Folds and Dweezil Zappa are featured on the album, performing on the tracks "Why Does This Always Happen to Me?" and "Genius in France", respectively; the former spoofs the style of Folds himself, whereas the other is a pastiche of Dweezil's father, Frank.

On March 25, 2002, recording for Poodle Hat officially began. By mid-2002, six originals—"Hardware Store", "Party at the Leper Colony", "Wanna B Ur Lovr", "Why Does This Always Happen to Me?", "Bob", and "Genius in France"—had been recorded.

The album's first original song is "Hardware Store", a list song that, as the title suggests, is about a new neighborhood hardware store and describes the items that can be purchased there with excruciating detail. The song was originally intended to be a pastiche, or "style parody", of another (unspecified) artist, but during recording sessions it evolved into an original composition. In a GQ interview, Yankovic opted not to reveal the identity of the original parodied musical artist, explaining that if he did, the factoid would end up as a Wikipedia entry.

"Party at the Leper Colony" is a dance song set in a leper colony. The song makes heavy use of wordplay, lampooning common English idioms by taking them literally, often to a grotesque degree, as the characters with leprosy lose body parts throughout the song (e.g. "Dance all night to a rotten band/Come on, people, let's give 'em a hand"). "Wanna B Ur Lovr", a pastiche of Midnite Vultures-era Beck, consists of pick-up lines which become steadily more ridiculous and suggestive. Because the spelling of the song's title recalls the manner in which Prince titled many of his records, Yankovic specified on his website that the "song is actually intended to sound like me trying to sound like Beck trying to sound like Prince" [emphasis in original].

"Why Does This Always Happen to Me?" emulates the style of Ben Folds. According to music critic Nathan Rabin, the song "amplifies the noxious self-absorption of the American character to hilarious extremes" by describing a narrator who, upon hearing about a number of horrible tragedies, only complains about the (minor) inconveniences that affect him. Folds himself plays piano on the track. Yankovic later told The A.V. Club: "Ben and I are old friends at this point, and of course I sought his keyboard work for that song. So he came in and knocked it out. I think that's an F-Sharp, so he was kind of mad at me for that."

"Bob" is a style parody of Bob Dylan, composed entirely of palindromes (for instance, the song's first line is "I, man, am regal—a German am I", which reads the same when reversed). Rabin argues that the song's lyrics "sound cryptic enough to be genuine Dylanesque, but are in fact palindromes deliver in an uncanny re-creation of Dylan's nasal whine." The album's closer, "Genius in France", emulates the idiosyncratic style of Frank Zappa. Zappa's son, Dweezil performed the song's intro guitar solo. Lyrically, the song describes a person who, although rejected elsewhere, finds acceptance in France.

=== Parodies and polka ===
On March 21, 2003, Yankovic began working on the album's parody songs, as well as the record's polka medley. The album opens with the parody "Couch Potato", a play on Eminem's "Lose Yourself", the critically acclaimed single from the film 8 Mile (2002). In Yankovic's version, the singer describes his obsession with watching television; the song references many TV shows, as well as cable and network channels. Prior to recording "Couch Potato", Yankovic researched television so that his resulting parody would be accurate. He noted, "If I'm writing a song about TV, I'll spend a lot of time watching TV. I'll study TV Guide, I'll look at articles about television, and I'll try to make sure I'm giving every show its fair do [sic]. I can also spend all day watching TV and convince myself that I'm working, because I'm doing research."

The album's second parody, "Trash Day", is a parody of "Hot in Herre" by Nelly. In this song, the narrator discusses the filthiness of his house and bemoans the titular day wherein people place their garbage outside of their living quarters to be picked up by a waste collector and brought to a landfill. "A Complicated Song" is a spoof of "Complicated" by Avril Lavigne. The song is composed of three vignettes: in the first, the singer laments that he is constipated, in the second, he discovers that he and his girlfriend are related, and in the third, he expresses regret that he was recently decapitated. "Ode to a Superhero" is a play on Billy Joel's song "Piano Man", and recounts the plot of the 2002 Spider-Man film.

The song "eBay", a parody of "I Want It That Way" by Backstreet Boys about the eponymous online auction site, became one of Yankovic's biggest hits.

The album's final parody is "eBay", based on "I Want It That Way" by Backstreet Boys. In this song, the narrator describes a variety of obscure items that he purchased on the online auction site eBay. Yankovic later noted, "I was going to shoot a video for eBay, but right at the same time, eBay started doing all of these commercials with song parodies. [...] I didn't want my parody to come off as a commercial for eBay. In retrospect, I probably should have done a video because it would have been one of my biggest hits." Indeed, the song is one of Yankovic's most popular, and ranks as one of his most-downloaded tracks on digital music outlets.

"Angry White Boy Polka", a medley of popular hit songs set to a polka beat, was recorded at the same time as the album's parodies. Yankovic explained, "[The medley] is a reflection on what songs I think would sound most ridiculous done as a polka [...] and for the [...] album, it reflected a genre of music that I thought probably would benefit from getting a polka treatment."

== Artwork and packaging ==
The cover of the CD depicts Yankovic with a poodle on his head, standing in a crowded subway car. The poodle in question was Yankovic's own dog, Bela. Before deciding on the final shot of his poodle, Yankovic and his production crew tried a setup that featured Bela urinating on his head, but Yankovic later admitted, "It was more disgusting than funny." In regards to the people standing behind him in the subway car, Yankovic specified via the "Ask Al" Q&A on his website:

Well, let's see... the guy with the poodle on his head would be me. The very pregnant woman with the sunglasses is my wife Suzanne. The guy in the surgical scrubs is my friend Joel Miller. The woman in the foreground with her legs crossed is my first-cousin-once-removed Tammy (who also played Queen Amidala in my video for "The Saga Begins"). Uh Jeff, the guy that screens my fan mail, is the guy wearing the NY Yankees cap way in the back. Steve Jay's son Ian is the really tall blond bicycle messenger. Tracy Berna, one of the writers for The Weird Al Show, is the waitress with the beehive hair-do. The Boy Scout is Dylan Bostick, the oldest son of one of Suzanne's oldest friends. Bermuda's wife Leslie is in there too. Plus there's my mother-in-law, my father-in-law, my electrician, a couple from my church, the owner of my favorite ice cream shop, my aunt's boyfriend... I think we got maybe 2 or 3 people from the casting office, but the overwhelming majority were friends and family members that just wanted to come to the shoot.

The album was released on an Enhanced CD, and when the CD is placed into a computer, bonus content is made available. This content includes several of Yankovic's real home videos and his commentary on them, as well as synchronized lyrics and instrumental or acoustic versions of some songs. A photo gallery is also included.

== Music video controversy ==
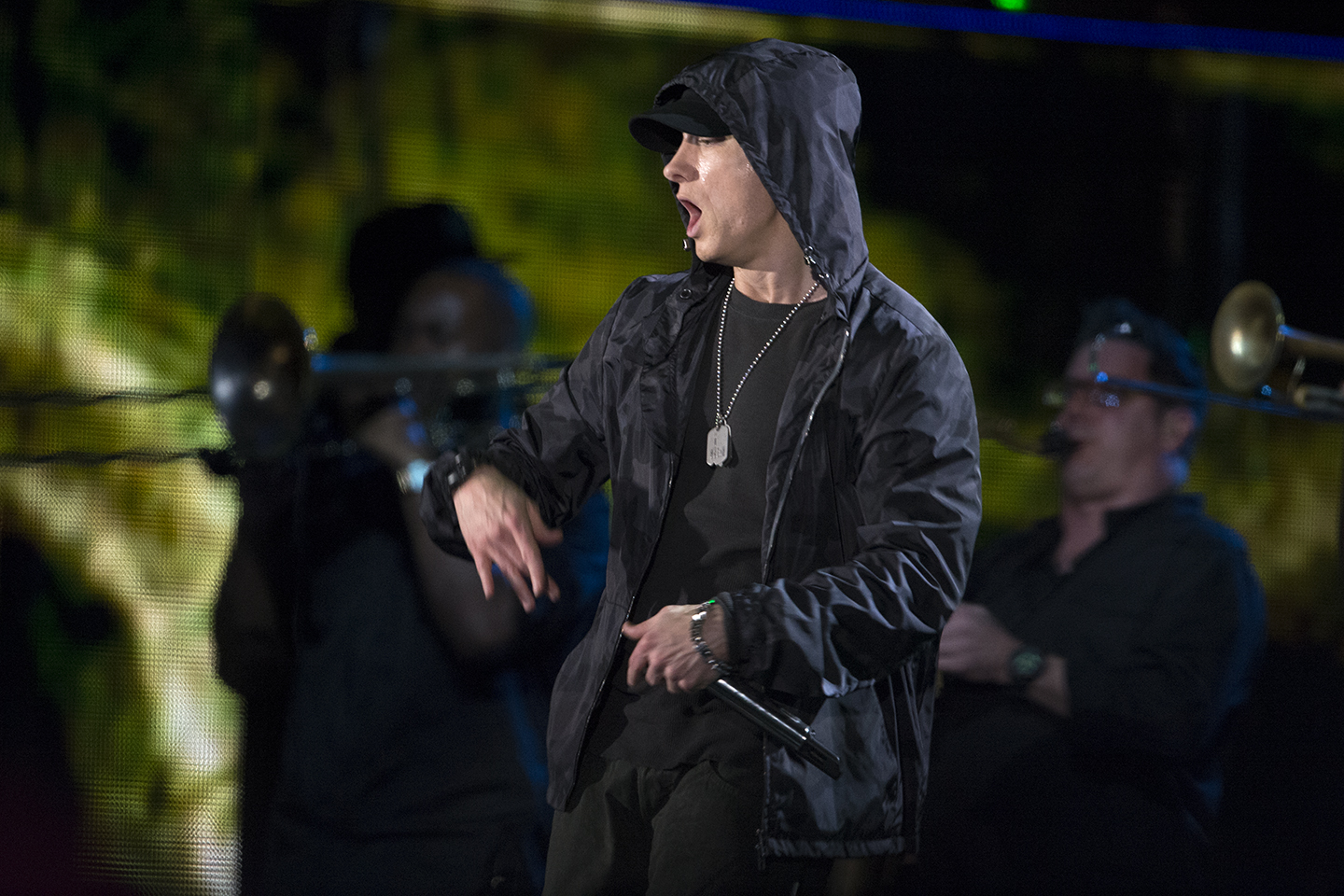
The album's opening track is "Couch Potato", a parody of Eminem's (pictured) single "Lose Yourself". Although Eminem approved of the parody, he vetoed Yankovic's request to film a music video.

A music video for "Couch Potato" was to be shot shortly after the album's release, but Eminem denied Yankovic permission to shoot it. Yankovic told the Chicago Sun-Times in 2003:

We were already in pre-production. We believed that it was just a formality, that Eminem just wanted to hear the final mix of the song... And then we got a phone call saying he was not going to give permission for a video. We were devastated [...] I certainly don't have any bad feelings toward Eminem. He was gracious enough to let us use the song on the album—and we use "The Real Slim Shady" in the "Angry White Boy Polka" medley, too. But this is the first album I've ever released without an accompanying video.

According to Yankovic, Eminem worried that a parody of his video might "detract from his legacy [and] that [...] would somehow make people take him less seriously as an important hip-hop artist". Musicologist Lily Hirsch noted that, while race was not mentioned by either party, the powerful visual impression of a Weird Al video could have undermined Eminem's efforts to be seen as a serious rap artist instead of a "wigger".

Yankovic was rather upset that a video for "Couch Potato" would not be made, as he felt that it would have been "the best video that [he had] ever done". Yankovic later revealed that the video would have taken on the form of a "'patchwork quilt' montage spoofing the most famous scenes from Eminem's videos." Yankovic mocked the situation on his 2003 Al TV special where he staged a mock interview with the rapper using footage from a real Eminem interview on MTV News. Eminem said, "I believe in... artistic expression." Yankovic countered with, "So you think, for example if somebody wanted to do, oh, I don't know, a parody of somebody else's video, they should be able to... artistically express themselves and just do it?" Eminem was shown at a loss for words. Eminem later discussed the mock interview in the book The Way I Am, wherein he claimed to have taken the jab in good fun:

Weird Al also got me. He made a video, did a fake interview with me, spliced it with clips from my old interviews, and put it up on the Internet. He's a very funny motherfucker. When something like that happens, you have to sit back and say, "Oh, he got me." It's something you pick up from battles: you learn to be a good sport about a lot of stuff. If you want to dish it out, you've got to be able to take it.

So that the album would not be without a video, a quick one for "Bob" was shot, which references the promotional clip of Dylan's song, "Subterranean Homesick Blues", which was shot for the 1967 D. A. Pennebaker documentary Dont Look Back. It was used on the tour and for the 2003 edition of Al TV. The video for "Bob" was subsequently released on "Weird Al" Yankovic: The Ultimate Video Collection DVD (2003).

== Critical reception ==
Professional ratings
Review scores
Source	Rating
AllMusic	2/5 stars
Entertainment Weekly	B
Pitchfork	6.5/10
Billboard	Positive
Rolling Stone	2/5 stars

The album received mixed reviews from music critics. Evan Serpick of Entertainment Weekly awarded the album a "B". While he felt that "Couch Potato" was, musically, up to par with Eminem's original, he noted, "It's hard to imagine today's tough tykes choosing" to listen to the somewhat tame parody. Serpick also felt that the Nelly and Avril Lavigne parodies were "full of noisome effects and clownish voices that would make even the widest eyes roll." He ended his review by praising the album's polka medley, saying it "exposes the songs for the pretentious rock babble they are."

Stephen Thomas Erlewine of AllMusic claimed that the album was evidence that "pop culture [was] ahead of Weird Al". He felt that many of songs belied an inherent misconception of youth culture on the part of Yankovic, and that with Poodle Hat, the artist was "offering generalizations about a culture he doesn't understand". But while he claimed that the record "stumbles over the obviousness and awfulness of its parodies", Erlewine enjoyed "Hardware Store", "Why Does This Always Happen to Me?", and "Genius in France" (for being "complicated" and "intricate"; a "sensitive piano pop tune with a good send-up of narcissistic lyrics and nice, layered vocal harmonies"; and "the most ambitious and weirdest thing here, which counts for a lot," respectively).

The writers of The Rolling Stone Album Guide awarded the album two stars, denoting a record that is "fair to poor" and that "fall[s] below an artist's established standard". A review of the album by Billboard, however, praised the album, noting that it "crackles with amusing parodies", proving that Yankovic is "a sharp observer of the world—and that's what makes [him] such an enduring, compelling figure."

=== Accolades ===
Poodle Hat won a Grammy Award for Best Comedy Album. This made it his first Grammy Award win since 1988, when his video for "Fat" won for Best Concept Music Video. Part of the reason for this dearth of awards was because, from 1993 until 2003, the Grammy Award for Best Comedy Album had been changed to "Grammy Award for Best Spoken Word Comedy"—meaning that Yankovic's musical comedy records were not eligible for nomination.

== Commercial performance ==
Upon its release, Poodle Hat charted domestically at number 17 on the Billboard 200. It also charted at number 12 on Billboard's Top Internet Albums. Poodle Hat has not been certified by the Recording Industry Association of America (RIAA), making it one of only a handful of "Weird Al" Yankovic albums to not receive the honor. Nathan Rabin, in Weird Al: The Book (2012), argues that this is because "Couch Potato" never had a music video, resulting in the album stumbling commercially.

Although no official singles were released from the album, the song "eBay" nevertheless charted at number 15 on Billboard's Bubbling Under Hot 100 Singles chart (which, in effect, corresponds to 115 on the Billboard Hot 100 singles chart).

In late 2013, Yankovic sued his label, Volcano, and its parent company, Sony Music, for unpaid publishing royalties from several of his albums and singles, including Poodle Hat. Yankovic claimed that—despite the album's success—he never earned royalties from the record. The initial lawsuit was for $5 million; Yankovic won the lawsuit and was awarded an undisclosed sum of money from Sony.

== Track listing ==
No.	Title	Writer(s)	Parody of	Length
1.	"Couch Potato"	Jeffrey Bass, Marshall Mathers III, Luis Resto, Alfred Yankovic	"Lose Yourself" by Eminem	4:18
2.	"Hardware Store"	Yankovic	Original	3:44
3.	"Trash Day"	Charles Brown, Cornell Haynes Jr., Pharrell Williams, Yankovic	"Hot in Herre" by Nelly	3:12
4.	"Party at the Leper Colony"	Yankovic	Style parody of the Bo Diddley beat	3:38
5.	"Angry White Boy Polka"	Various	A polka medley including: "Last Resort" by Papa Roach; "Chop Suey!" by System of a Down; "Get Free" by the Vines; "Hate to Say I Told You So" by the Hives; "Fell in Love with a Girl" by the White Stripes; "Last Nite" by the Strokes; "Down with the Sickness" by Disturbed; "Renegades of Funk" by Rage Against the Machine, originally by Afrika Bambaataa; "My Way" by Limp Bizkit; "Outside" by Staind; "Bawitdaba" by Kid Rock; "Youth of the Nation" by P.O.D.; "The Real Slim Shady" by Eminem; "Poodle Hat Polka" by "Weird Al" Yankovic	5:04
6.	"Wanna B Ur Lovr"	Yankovic	Style parody of Midnite Vultures-era Beck	6:14
7.	"A Complicated Song"	Lauren Christy, Graham Edwards, Avril Lavigne, Scott Spock, Yankovic	"Complicated" by Avril Lavigne	3:40
8.	"Why Does This Always Happen to Me?"	Yankovic	Style parody of Ben Folds	4:52
9.	"Ode to a Superhero"	Billy Joel, Yankovic	"Piano Man" by Billy Joel	4:53
10.	"Bob"	Yankovic	Style parody of Bob Dylan	2:29
11.	"eBay"	Andreas Carlsson, Martin Sandberg, Yankovic	"I Want It That Way" by Backstreet Boys	3:36
12.	"Genius in France"	Yankovic	Style parody of Frank Zappa	8:58
Total length:				54:38

== Personnel ==
Credits adapted from CD liner notes, except where noted.

Band members

- "Weird Al" Yankovic – lead vocals (tracks 1–12), background vocals (tracks 1–8, 11–12), keyboards (tracks 1–2, 12), group vocals (tracks 4, 6), accordion (tracks 5, 9, 12), claps (track 5), shouts (track 5), party noises (track 5)
- Jon "Bermuda" Schwartz – drum programming (track 1, 3, 6, 11), drums (tracks 2, 4–5, 7–10, 12), percussion (track 4–5, 7, 10, 12), group vocals (tracks 4, 6), claps (track 5), shouts (track 5), party noises (track 5), laugh (track 12), snork (track 12)
- Jim West – guitars (tracks 1–7, 9–12), group vocals (tracks 4, 6), claps (track 5), shouts (track 5), party noises (track 5), mandolin (track 9)
- Steve Jay – bass guitar (tracks 1–12), group vocals (tracks 4, 6), banjo (track 5), claps (track 5), shouts (track 5), party noises (track 5)

Additional musicians

- Kim Bullard – keyboards (tracks 1, 3, 6, 7, 11)
- Lisa Popeil – female background vocals (track 2)
- Julia Waters – female vocal (track 3), female background vocals (track 12)
- Rubén Valtierra – keyboards (tracks 4, 10), piano (track 9)
- Tom Evans – saxophone (tracks 4, 6, 12)
- Warren Luening – trumpets (track 5)
- Joel Peskin – clarinets (track 5)
- Tommy Johnson – tuba (track 5)
- Lee Thornburg – trumpet and trombone (track 6, 12)
- DJ Swamp – scratching (track 6)
- Ben Folds – piano (track 8)
- John "Juke" Logan – harmonica (track 9)
- Will Anderson – harmonica (track 10)
- Herb Pedersen – banjo (track 12)
- Maxine Waters – female background vocals (track 12)
- Carmen Twillie^{1} – female background vocals (track 12)
- Bela – barking (track 12)
- Dweezil Zappa – intro guitar solo (track 12)

Technical

- "Weird Al" Yankovic – producer
- Tony Papa – engineer, mixing
- Rafael Serrano – engineer
- Mark Seliger – photography
- Jackie Murphy – art design
- Nick Gamma – art design
- Bernie Grundman – mastering
- Doug Sanderson – assistant engineer (track 5)
- Aaron Kaplan – assistant mixing engineer (tracks 2, 4, 6, 8, 10, 12)
- Tony Zoeller – assistant mixing engineer (tracks 1, 3, 5, 7, 9, 11)
NOTES
- ^{1}Misspelled as "Twilley" in liner notes.

== Charts and certifications ==
=== Charts ===
Chart performance for Poodle Hat
Chart (2003)	Peak position
Australian Albums (ARIA)	26
US Billboard 200	17
US Comedy Albums	12
US Top Internet Albums	12

=== Singles ===
Year	Song	Chart	Position
2007	"eBay"	Billboard Hot 100	115

== References in the song "Couch Potato" ==
=== Television shows and movies ===
- 8 Simple Rules for Dating My Teenage Daughter
- 24
- 60 Minutes
- Da Ali G Show
- The Amazing Race
- American Idol
- The Anna Nicole Show
- Are You Hot?
- The Bachelorette
- Celebrity Mole
- CSI: Boise (referring to CSI and its many spinoffs, such as CSI: Miami)
- The Drew Carey Show
- E! True Hollywood Story
- Entertainment Tonight
- Everybody Tolerates Raymond (referring to Everybody Loves Raymond)
- Fear Factor
- The Flintstones
- Gilligan's Island
- Inside the Actors Studio
- King of Queens
- Larry King Live
- Law & Order
- Lost in Space
- MacGyver
- Melrose Place
- The Muppet Show
- NASCAR
- The Oprah Winfrey Show
- The Osbournes (referred to as Ozzy's family's show)
- Scanners
- Six Feet Under (referred to as "that show about undertaking")
- The Sopranos
- SpongeBob SquarePants
- Survivor
- The Tonight Show with Jay Leno
- Touched by an Uncle (referring to Touched by an Angel)
- Welcome Back, Kotter
- Will & Grace
- Without a Trace

=== Television networks ===
- A&E
- AMC
- Court TV
- C-SPAN
- Discovery Channel
- Disney Channel
- Fox
- HBO
- History Channel
- Learning Channel
- Lifetime Television
- MTV
- Playboy Channel
- QVC
- Sci-Fi Channel
- Travel Channel
- TV Land
- Weather Channel

=== Celebrities ===
- Drew Carey
- Simon Cowell
- Larry King
- Lisa Kudrow
- Jay Leno
- James Lipton
- Jennifer Lopez
- Madonna
- Ozzy Osbourne
- Luke Perry
- Rob Schneider
- Richard Simmons
- Anna Nicole Smith
- Oprah Winfrey

== See also ==
- List of singles by "Weird Al" Yankovic
- List of songs by "Weird Al" Yankovic
