= List of English palindromic phrases =

A palindrome is a word, number, phrase, or other sequence of symbols that reads the same backwards as forwards, such as the sentence: "A man, a plan, a canal – Panama". Following is a list of palindromic phrases of two or more words in the English language, found in multiple independent collections of palindromic phrases.

As late as 1821, The New Monthly Magazine reported that there was only one known palindrome in the English language: "Lewd did I live, & evil I did dwel (sic)". In the following centuries, many more English palindromes were constructed. For many long-attested or well-known palindromes, authorship can not be determined, although a number can tentatively be attributed to a handful of prolific palindrome creators. Because of the popularity of palindromes as a form of word play, a number of sources have collected and listed popular palindromes, and palindrome-constructing contests have been held.

== Notable palindromic phrases in English ==
Palindrome	Notes	Source(s)
Able was I ere I saw Elba	Fancifully attributed to Napoleon, who was exiled to Elba.	
A dog! A panic in a pagoda!	(Note: Appears as a lyric in the "Weird Al" Yankovic song, "Bob".)	
Ah, Satan sees Natasha		
A man, a plan, a canal – Panama!	Devised by Leigh Mercer, a noted British word play expert.	
A man? A prisoner! A cage? Iron! Did Noriega care? No, sir! Panama!	Devised by project management theorist Steve "The Bajan" Devaux	
A Toyota or A Toyota's a Toyota		
Dennis sinned or Dennis and Edna sinned	Numerous variations insert additional names.	
Doc, note: I dissent. A fast never prevents a fatness. I diet on cod	Written by mathematician Peter Hilton	
Do geese see God?		
Do nine men Interpret? Nine men I nod		
Drab as a fool, aloof as a bard or Drab as a fool, as aloof as a bard		
Draw, o coward!		
Egad, a base tone denotes a bad age	(Note: Appears as a lyric in the They Might Be Giants song, "I Palindrome I".)	
God, a red nugget, a fat egg under a dog		
Go hang a salami, I'm a lasagna hog	Coined by musician Baby Gramps.	
I, man, am Regal, a German am I		
If I had a hi-fi		
Lewd did I live & evil I did dwel; or Lewd did I live, evil I did dwel	Coined by poet John Taylor, in 1614.	
Lid off a daffodil		
Lived on decaf, faced no devil		
Lisa Bonet ate no basil		
Lonely Tylenol		
Madam, I'm Adam	Fancifully attributed to the biblical figure, Adam.	
Ma is as selfless as I am		
May a moody baby doom a yam?		
Mr. Owl ate my metal worm		
Name now one man or Name no one man		
Naomi, I moan or Naomi, did I moan? or Naomi, sex at noon taxes I moan.		
Never odd or even		
No lemons, no melon or No lemon, no melon		
No one made killer apparel like Dame Noon.	Coined by palindromist Jon Agee.	
No devil lived on		
Not a banana baton		
Now I see bees, I won		
No X in Nixon or No X in Mr. R. M. Nixon		
Nurse, I spy gypsies, run!		
O Geronimo, no minor ego		
Oh no! Don Ho!		
Oozy rat in a sanitary zoo		
O, stone, be not so		
Pa's a sap		
Pull up if I pull up.		
Race car		
Race fast, safe car		
Rats live on no evil star		
Rise to vote, sir		
Satan, oscillate my metallic sonatas.		
Senile felines		
Sir, I'm Iris		
Sit on a potato pan, Otis!		
Step on no pets		
Stop pots		
Swap God for a janitor; rot in a jar of dog paws.	Very well-known	and countless more
T. Eliot, top bard, notes putrid tang emanating, is sad; I'd assign it a name: gnat dirt upset on drab pot toilet.	Written by Scottish poet Alastair Reid.	
Too bad I hid a boot		
Too hot to hoot		
UFO tofu	Title of the 1992 Béla Fleck and the Flecktones album, UFO Tofu.	
Warsaw was raw		
Was it a cat I saw or Was it a car or a cat I saw?	Many variations of the middle word(s) are possible.	
We panic in a pew		
Won't lovers revolt now?		
Zeus sees Suez or Zeus saw 'twas Suez		

== See also ==
- List of palindromic places
