= Noam Dovev =

Israeli palindrome author, poet, short story writer, and Wikipedian

- נעם דובב
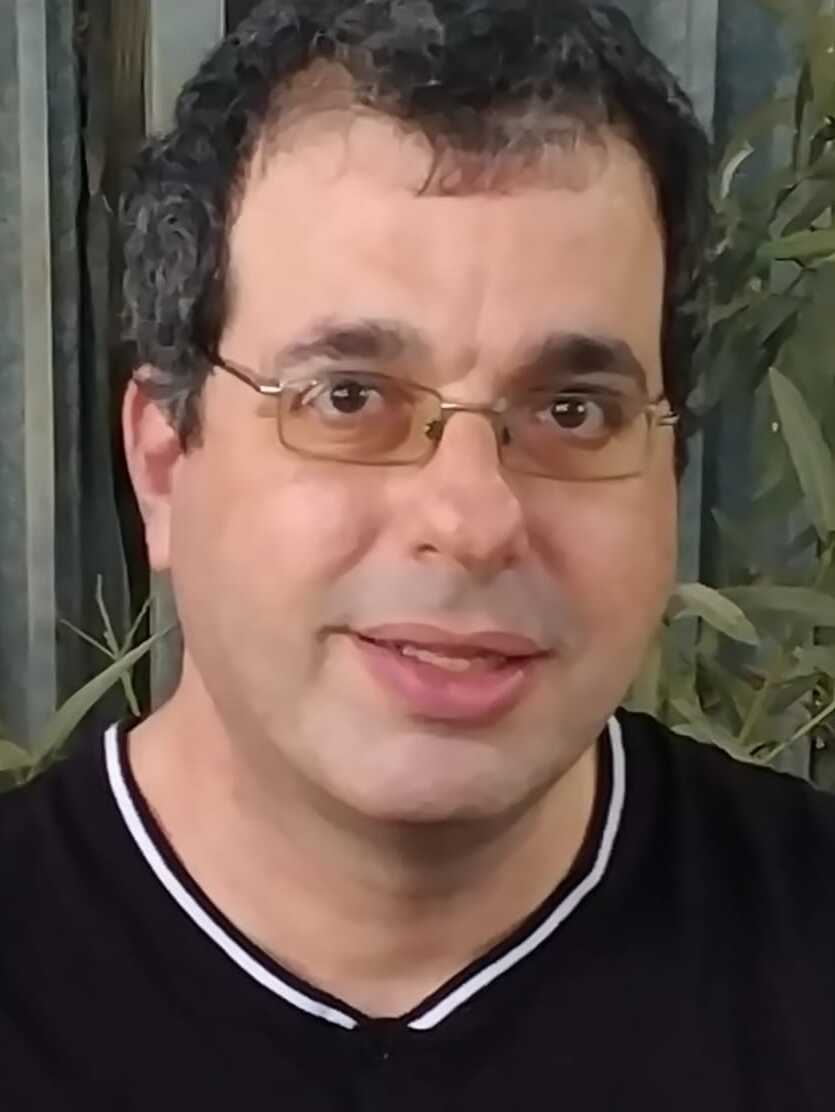
- Dovev in September 2020
- Born: May 23, 1974 (age 52); Israel
- Occupations: consultant; manager
- Known for: palindrome poetry, short story writing
- Notable work: The only palindromic poetry books in Hebrew: "Word row" (Hebrew: הלימת מילה) (2020); "Not on" (Hebrew: כְּשֶׁחָשַׁךְ) (2022); The longest palindrome in Hebrew: "I'll undo god (null), I" (Hebrew: משהו נוצר כרצונו, השם) (2,662 words, 9,779 words, 2024)
- Spouse: Naama Shraiber
- Website: palindromes.co

Noam Dovev (Hebrew: נעם דובב; born May 23, 1974) is an Israeli palindrome author, poet, short story writer, and former Wikipedian. He is the holder of several records in the field of creating palindromes in Hebrew: the four longest palindromes, headed by "One? No one, no" (Hebrew: גישה אל שיא איש לא השיג); The only two books of palindromic poetry so far, Word Row (Hebrew: הלימת מילה) and Not on (Hebrew: כְּשֶׁחָשַׁךְ); and the biggest palindromic magic square. He lectures on palindromes, writing under constraints and word games in jumbles.

== Biography ==
Dovev served in the IDF as head of the information security team in a technology unit, and since 1999 has been involved in information security as a consultant and manager.

=== Palindrome activity ===
Dovev writes songs and stories based on tongue twisters. He generally focuses on writing with constraints (such as anagrams) and in particular on palindromes which are sometimes combined with additional constraints. He also composed palindromes by words.

In 2011 he created the biggest palindromic magic square in Hebrew of order 6, larger than the famous magic square of order 5 composed by Rabbi Abraham Ibn Ezra in the 12th century.

==== Palindromic fiction ====
Dovev writes palindromic short stories. He broke the record for the longest palindrome in Hebrew five times, and in all the records he set below are the numbers of palindromic words and letters:

1. "Do, God" (Hebrew: מימש ה' עולם מלוע השמים) - a palindrome of 363 words and 1,331 letters. It was published in April 2010 and broke a 120-year-old record of Rabbi Yehuda "Julius" Hirsch, who wrote a palindromic obituary for his father, Rabbi Hirsch.
2. "Name sold, I'd lose man" (Hebrew: מות תום) - a short story, published in February 2013 and dealing with the Holocaust. It contains 1,111 words (including 767 names) and 4,224 letters and other palindromic elements.
3. "Did & did & did..." - a palindrome that includes 1,331 words and 3,883 letters and deals with linguistics. It was published in December 2021.
4. "Names reverse, man!" (Hebrew: שונאי אנוש) - a palindrome of 1,881 words and 7,557 letters, dealing with the fate partnership in Israel. It was published in November 2022.
5. "One? No one, no" (Hebrew: גישה אל שיא איש לא השיג) - a palindrome that includes 2,552 words and 8,668 letters, and deals with a complete lack of access. It was published in May 2023.

The last four palindromes in the list above are the four longest palindromes in Hebrew.

==== Palindromic poetry ====
In early 2020 Dovev published his first book, Word row (Hebrew: הלימת מילה) in Gnat Micropress, which is the first book of palindromic poetry in Hebrew. The names of the book in Hebrew, in English and in Arabic ("كلمة ملك") are also palindromic. On top of that, all the songs, titles, cover names and chapters in the book are palindromic, and even the numbers of the chapters, pages and songs are palindromic. The book was launched on the palindromic date 02.02.2020 (February 2, 2020), at 20:02. The book contains, among other things, a palindromic haiku poem and a 666-word rhyming poem, based on the longest palindrome in Hebrew (as of that time). Later in the year, he participated in the Jerusalem Poetry Festival on behalf of "A Place for Poetry" (Hebrew: מקום לשירה), where he read a selection of the poems from the book.

In early 2022, his book of poems Not on (Hebrew: כְּשֶׁחָשַׁךְ) was published by Gnat Micropress. The book deals with the separation from his younger brother, Oz Keret-Dovev, who died of cancer. The book was launched on the palindrome date 22.02.2022 (February 22, 2022) at 20:02. Ido Nitzan from the Israeli daily newspaper Israel Hayom wrote: "Noam Dovev's book of poems, which includes only palindromic poems, fails to rise above the linguistic gimmick... Sometimes the rigid framework of the book undercuts the emotion of grief, and makes the poetry artificial and the reading experience purely playful and technical... Also, in some of the poems in the book, the palindromic constraint creates a mixture of sloppy and partial syntax and of uneven language combinations, whose reward is their loss. For example, in the poem that closes the book, which looks more like an automatic message from a computer program than like a poem ... the creaking combination of the verb "feels" (Hebrew: חש) with the everyday slang "feels bad" (Hebrew: מרגיש גרוע) creates a linguistic monster, which partially rhymes: "feels bad / without sweat" (Hebrew: וחש גרוע / בלי לזוע), which cannot seriously convey a sense of loss... However, some of the poems in the book are beautiful and very moving."

==== Palindromic sentences ====
Dovev composed palindromic sentences. He composed a bilingual palindrome, which has the same meaning in Hebrew and English: "Go, dog" (Hebrew: כלב לך). He also wrote palindromic sentences in English. Other examples of short palindromic sentences he composed: "If Av hadn't come, would Elul come?" (Hebrew: לולא אב, הבא אלול?), "The innocence, is in my opinion, dead" (Hebrew: התמימות, לתומי, מתה); "There is a queue, but is there a service?!" (Hebrew: תור יש, ושירות?!); "Soon the science shone." (Hebrew: עד מהרה זהר המדע).

Dovev also published palindromic sentences, the two halves of each of which are a pangram.

== Personal life ==
Dovev is married to Naama Shraiber, a cook who is engaged in rehabilitative cooking instruction, and they live in Petah Tikva.
