= Gregory Betts =

Canadian poet, editor and professor

- Born: 1975 (age 50–51); Vancouver, British Columbia, Canada
- Education: Queen's University, York University
- Occupations: Poet, Professor, Editor
- Writing career
- Subject: Avant-Garde Literature
- Website: gregorybetts.wordpress.com

Gregory Betts (born 1975) is a Canadian scholar, poet, editor and professor.

He has taught at University of Toronto, Johannes Gutenberg Universität Mainz, Brock University, and University College Dublin. He is currently a professor at Brock University with a speciality in Canadian and avant-garde literature. He is the author of nine books of poetry, editor of nine books of experimental writing in Canada, and author of the monograph Avant-Garde Canadian Literature: The Early Manifestations (University of Toronto Press, 2013) and the monograph Finding Nothing: The VanGardes, 1959-1975 (University of Toronto Press, 2021). He was named the Chancellor's Chair for Research Excellence at Brock University in 2014 and the Craig Dobbin Professor of Canadian Studies at University College Dublin in 2018. In 2020, he became the President of the Association of Canadian College and University Teachers of English, the largest literary association for the study of English in Canada.

== Life and work ==
Betts was born in Vancouver, British Columbia, but was raised in Toronto, Ontario. He graduated from Queen's University with a BA in English in 1998. He studied with Stephen Scobie, Misao Dean, Smaro Kamboureli, and George Bowering at the University of Victoria, where he graduated with an MA in 2000. Betts received his PhD in English literature from York University, supervised by John Lennox, Steve McCaffery, and Ray Ellenwood. He is a professor at Brock University with a speciality in Canadian and Avant-Garde Literature. He is the author of seven books of poetry, editor of nine books of experimental writing in Canada, and author of the monograph Avant-Garde Canadian Literature: The Early Manifestations (University of Toronto Press, 2013). He writes for The Canadian Encyclopaedia and his work is included in the anthologies Against Expression: An Anthology of Conceptual Writing (2011), The Sonnets: Translating & Rewriting Shakespeare (2012), and Concrete & Constraint (2018), amongst others. In addition to his books, Betts is the author of chapbooks and text collaborations with visual artists, including Matt Donovan and Hallie Siegel, Neil Hennessy, and Arnold McBay. He co-edited the collection Avant Canada: Poets, Prophets, Revolutionaries (with Christian Bök; Wilfrid Laurier University Press, 2019), a collection of 28 leading scholars and poets of the Canadian avant-garde.

Betts published his first book of poetry, If Language, in 2005. The book consists of fifty-six anagrams based on a 525-letter source quote by Canadian poet and scholar Steve McCaffery. In 2009 he published The Others Raisd in Me: 150 Readings of Sonnet 150; A Plunderverse Project. The collection of poems was accomplished by deleting words or letters from William Shakespeare's Sonnet 150 in order to create adapted works of poetry.

Betts edited the collection The Wrong World: Selected Stories and Essays of Bertram Brooker in 2009. The book highlights how Canadian visual artist Bertram Brooker played a significant role in the Canadian literary modernist movement. Through essays, short fiction, and a novella, Betts displays Brooker's views on culture, technology, and society as well as his hesitations with modernism. Writing in the British Journal of Canadian Studies, Anouk Lang suggested that "the short fiction and the essays would lend themselves well to courses on modernism, both in the context of Canadian literature and modernism considered more globally, while the volume as a whole will be of interest to scholars of twentieth-century thought and literature."

Betts also published This Is Importance: A Student's Guide to Literature in 2013. The book compiles errors from years of mistakes by his students and organizes them to create a poetic collage. Betts pushes the importance of making mistakes as part of the learning experience and also for opening a window to new possibilities. Reviewing the book in This, Jonathan Ball observed that Betts's arrangement of the content helps to "produce strange, brilliant, unintentional wordplay, with accidentally clever insights that are often laugh-out-loud funny."

He lives in St. Catharines, Ontario, with his wife and two children, Jasper John and Mackenzie Betts.

=== Reception ===
The University of Toronto Quarterly wrote, "Betts has created not only an invaluable archive of what it means to be 'modern' in Canada - the writings read like a cross-section of compacted layers social, material, and spiritual crisis in urban and rural Canada...but to the wider context of aesthetic, political, and spiritual fault lines of modern culture in English Canada." In 2014, Betts was named the Chancellor's Chair for Research Excellence at Brock University. In 2017, he received a City of St. Catharines Arts Award ("Jury's Pick") and in 2018, he was named the Craig Dobbin Professor of Canadian Studies at the University College of Dublin, Ireland.

Finding Nothing: The VanGardes, 1959-1975 received the 2022 Basil Stuart-Stubbs Prize for Outstanding Book on British Columbia. Dr. Susan E. Parker, UBC's University Librarian, said, "The story laid out in this book, which is at once coherent and many-dimensioned, represents a huge volume of research material that has been thoroughly examined and analyzed. The book models what deft handling of complicated subject matter and materials should be. We are pleased to recognize Dr. Betts' book with the Basil' Stuart-Stubbs Prize." The book has also received the 2021 Gabrielle Roy Prize, which each year honours the best work of scholarship on literature produced in Canada written in English. The judges said, "Filled with visual evidence of a vibrant cultural movement, this is a crucial source for those with an interest in late twentieth-century poetry and visual art, the history of small press activity, and the cultural histories of Vancouver."

== Works ==
- Finding Nothing: The VanGardes, 1959-1975. Toronto: University of Toronto Press, 2021.
- Avant-Garde Canadian Literature: The Early Manifestations. Toronto: University of Toronto Press, 2013.

=== Poetry books ===
- The Fabulous Op. Co-written with Gary Barwin. Co. Tipperary, Ireland: Beir Bua Press, 2022.
- Foundry. Achill Island, Ireland: RedFoxPress, 2021.
- Sweet Forme: Shake-Speare's Perfect Sonnets. Sydney, Australia: Apothecary Press, 2020.
- Boycott. Los Angeles: Make Now Press, 2014.
- This Is Importance: A Student’s Guide to Literature. Hamilton: Wolsak and Wynn, 2013.
- The Obvious Flap. Co-written with Gary Barwin. Toronto: BookThug, 2011.
- Psychic Geographies and Other Topics. Toronto: Quattro Press, 2010.
- The Others Raisd in Me. Toronto: Pedlar Press, 2009.
- Haikube. Produced in collaboration with Matt Donovan and Hallie Siegal. Toronto: BookThug, 2006.
- If Language. Toronto: BookThug, 2005.

=== As editor ===
- Editor and Introduction. They Have Bodies: A Realistic Novel in Five Acts. By Barney Allen. Ottawa: University of Ottawa Press, 2020.
- Co-editor and Introduction with Christian Bök. Avant Canada: Poets, Prophets, Reovlutionaries. Waterloo: Wilfrid Laurier University Press, 2019.
- Editor and Introduction. Space Between Her Lips: The Poetry of Margaret Christakos. Waterloo: Wilfrid Laurier University Press, 2017.
- Co-editor and Introduction with Paul Hjartarson and Kristine Smitka. Counterblasting Canada: Marshall McLuhan, Wyndham Lewis, Wilfred Watson, and Sheila Watson. Edmonton: University of Alberta Press, 2016.
- Co-editor with Derek Beaulieu. Avant Canada: More Useful Knowledge. An anthology of contemporary Canadian experimental writing. Calgary: NO Press, 2014.
- Co-editor and Afterword with Derek Beaulieu. RUSH: What Fuckan Theory; A Study uv Langwage. By bill bissett. Toronto: BookThug, 2012.
- Editor and Introduction. Lawren Harris In the Ward: His Poetry and Painting. Toronto: Exile Editions, 2007. Second edition modified to Contrasts: Lawren Harris In the Ward: A Book of Poetry and Paintings, 2012.
- Editor and introduction. After Exile: A Raymond Knister Poetry Reader. Toronto: Exile Editions, 2003. Second edition 2011.
- Editor and introduction. The Wrong World: Bertram Brooker’s Stories and Essays. Ottawa: The University of Ottawa Press, 2009.
- Assistant editor. W.W.E. Ross: Irrealities, Sonnets & Laconics. Editor Barry Callaghan. Toronto: Exile Editions, 2003.

== Artworks and exhibitions ==
- Haikube with Matt Donovan and Hallie Siegel. Olga Korper Gallery, Toronto 2007.
- Petits Genres with Matt Donovan and Hallie Siegel, Vanessa Place, and Christian Bök. Olga Korper Gallery, Toronto 2012.
- Exquisite Corp. Art Under Glass, St. Catharines 2011.
- The Twelve Trials of Jason Chimera with Neil Hennessy. Niagara Artists Centre, St. Catharines 2009.
- Signs of Our Discontent. With Arnold McBay. In the Soil Arts Festival, St. Catharines 2018.
