= Palindrome =

Sequence that reads the same forwards and backwards

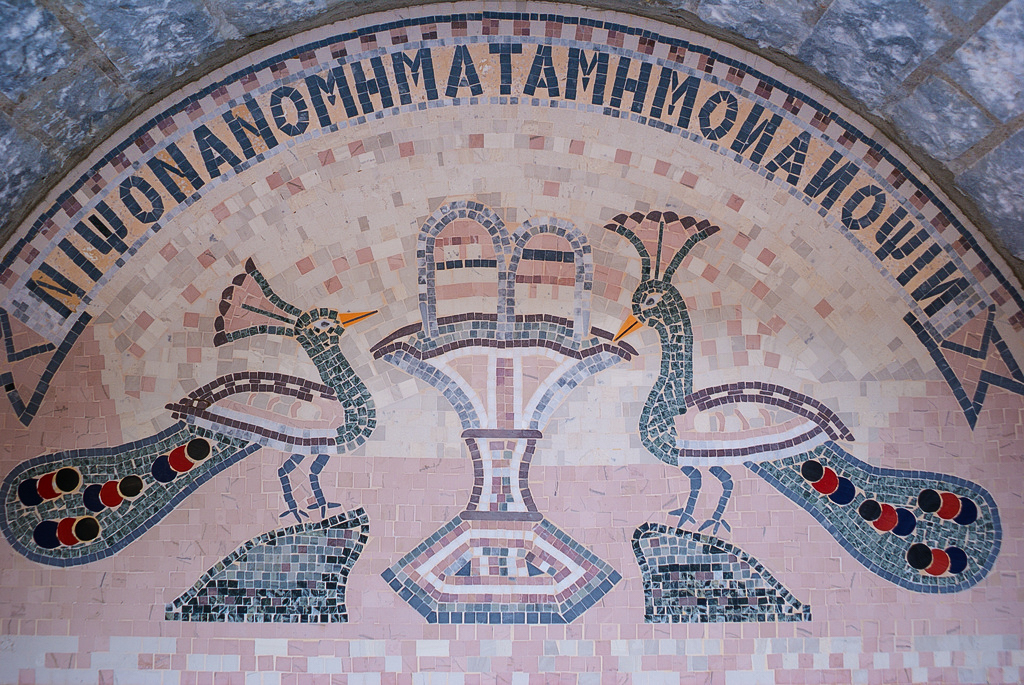
The notable 4th-century Greek Byzantine palindrome: ΝΙΨΟΝ ΑΝΟΜΗΜΑΤΑ ΜΗ ΜΟΝΑΝ ΟΨΙΝ (Wash Your Sins, Not Only Your Face) on a mosaic in the Monastery of Malevi in Greece.

A palindrome (/ˈpælɪndroʊm/) is a word, number, phrase, or other sequence of symbols that reads the same backwards as forwards, such as madam or racecar, the date "22/02/2022", or the sentence "A man, a plan, a canal – Panama". The 19-letter Finnish language word saippuakivikauppias (a soapstone vendor) is the longest single-word palindrome in everyday use, while the 12-letter term tattarrattat (from James Joyce in Ulysses) is the longest in the English language.

The word palindrome was introduced by English poet and writer Henry Peacham in 1638. The concept of a palindrome can be dated to the 3rd-century BCE, although no examples survive. The earliest known examples are the 1st-century CE Latin acrostic word square, the Sator Square (which contains both word and sentence palindromes), and the 4th-century Greek Byzantine sentence palindrome nipson anomēmata mē monan opsin.

Palindromes are also found in music (the table canon and crab canon) and biological structures (most genomes include palindromic gene sequences). In automata theory, the set of all palindromes over an alphabet is a context-free language, but it is not regular.

== Etymology ==
The word palindrome was introduced by English poet and writer Henry Peacham in 1638. It is derived from the Greek roots pálin (πάλιν) 'again' and drómos (δρóμος) 'way, direction'; a different word is used in Greek, karkinikós (καρκινικός) 'carcinic' (lit. 'crab-like') to refer to letter-by-letter reversible writing.

== Historical development ==
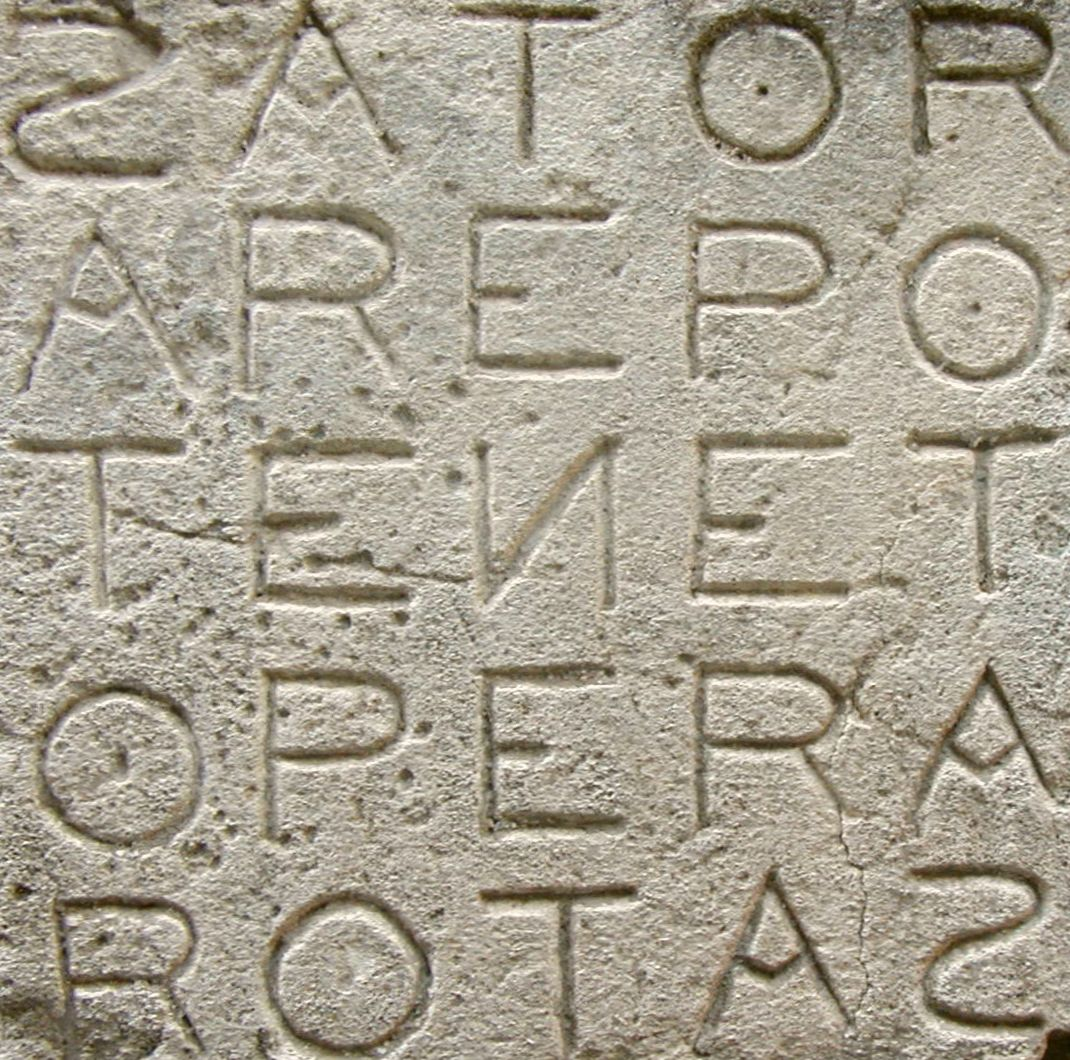
A Sator square (in SATOR-form), on a wall in the medieval fortress town of Oppède-le-Vieux, France

The ancient Greek poet Sotades (3rd-century BCE) invented a form of Ionic meter called Sotadic or Sotadean verse, which is sometimes said to have been palindromic, since it is sometimes possible to make a sotadean line by reversing a dactylic hexameter.

A 1st-century Latin palindrome was found as a graffito at Pompeii. This palindrome, known as the Sator Square, consists of a sentence written in Latin: sator arepo tenet opera rotas 'The sower Arepo holds with effort the wheels'. It is also an acrostic where the first letters of each word form the first word, the second letters form the second word, and so forth. Hence, it can be arranged into a word square that reads in four different ways: horizontally or vertically from either top left to bottom right or bottom right to top left. Other palindromes found at Pompeii include "Roma-Olim-Milo-Amor", which is also written as an acrostic square. Indeed, composing palindromes was "a pastime of Roman landed gentry".

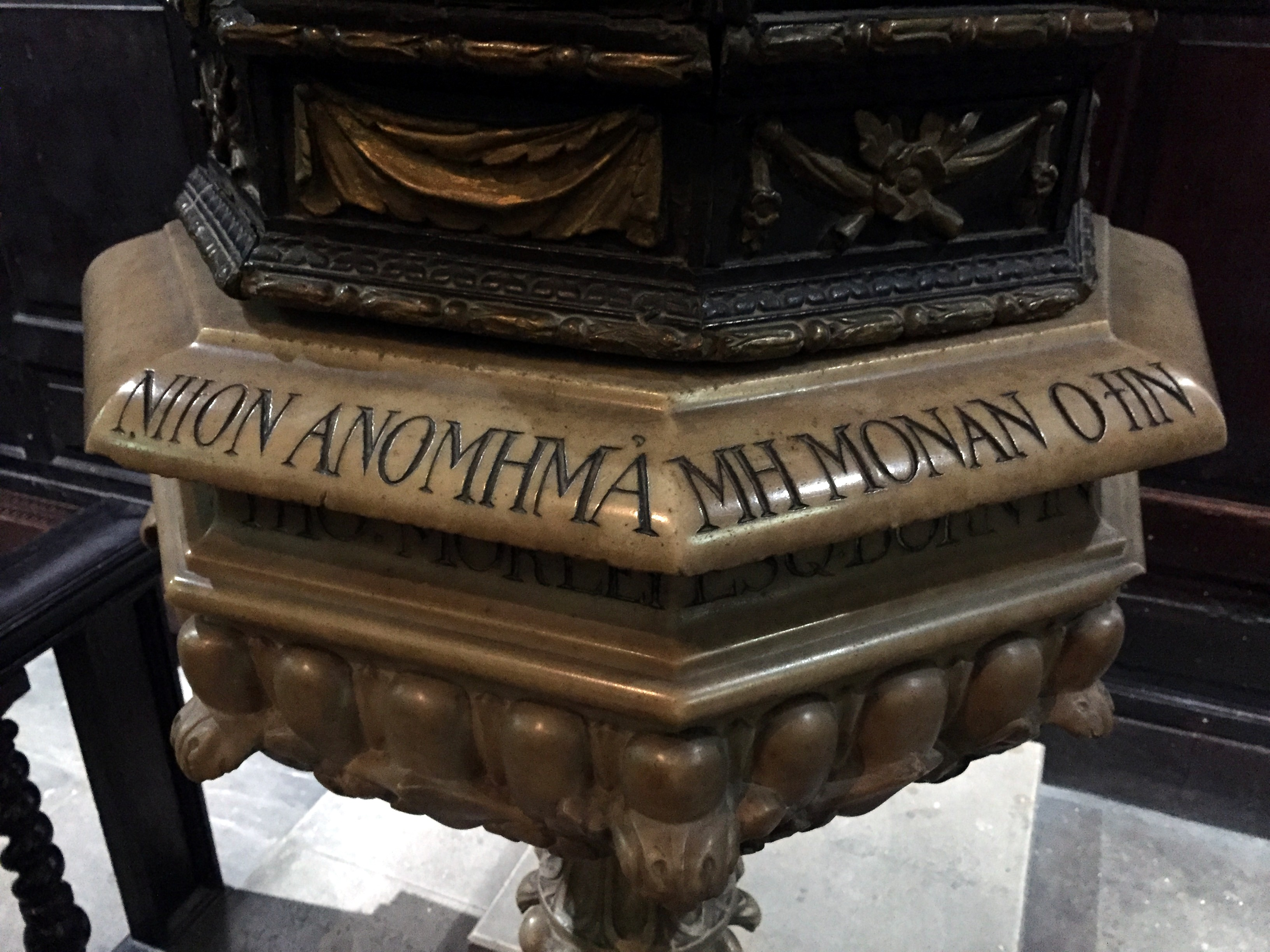
Nipson anomēmata mē monan opsin palindrome, on a font at St Martin, Ludgate

Byzantine baptismal fonts were often inscribed with the 4th-century Greek palindrome, ΝΙΨΟΝ ΑΝΟΜΗΜΑΤΑ (or ΑΝΟΜΗΜΑ) ΜΗ ΜΟΝΑΝ ΟΨΙΝ ("Nipson anomēmata mē monan opsin") 'Wash [your] sin(s), not only [your] face', attributed to Gregory of Nazianzus; most notably in the basilica of Hagia Sophia in Constantinople. The inscription is found on fonts in many churches in Western Europe: Orléans (St. Menin's Abbey); Dulwich College; Nottingham (St. Mary's); Worlingworth; Harlow; Knapton; London (St Martin, Ludgate); and Hadleigh (Suffolk).

A 12th-century palindrome with the same square property is the Hebrew palindrome, פרשנו רעבתן שבדבש נתבער ונשרף perashnu: ra`avtan shebad'vash nitba`er venisraf 'We explained the glutton who is in the honey was burned and incinerated', credited in 1924 to the medieval Jewish philosopher Abraham ibn Ezra, and referring to the halachic question as to whether a fly landing in honey makes the honey treif (non-kosher).

The palindromic Latin riddle "In girum imus nocte et consumimur igni" 'we go in a circle at night and are consumed by fire' describes the behavior of moths. It is likely that this palindrome is from medieval rather than ancient times. The second word, borrowed from Greek, should properly be spelled gyrum.

In English, there are many palindrome words such as eye, madam, and deified, but English writers generally cited Latin and Greek palindromic sentences in the early 19th century; though John Taylor had coined one in 1614: "Lewd did I live, & evil I did dwel" (with the ampersand being something of a "fudge"). This is generally considered the first English-language palindrome sentence and was long reputed, notably by the grammarian James "Hermes" Harris, to be the only one, despite many efforts to find others. (Taylor had also composed two other, "rather indifferent", palindromic lines of poetry: "Deer Madam, Reed", "Deem if I meed".) Then in 1848, a certain "J.T.R." coined "Able was I ere I saw Elba", which became famous after it was (implausibly) attributed to Napoleon (alluding to his exile on Elba). Other well-known English palindromes are: "A man, a plan, a canal – Panama" (1948), "Madam, I'm Adam" (1861), and "Never odd or even" (1930).

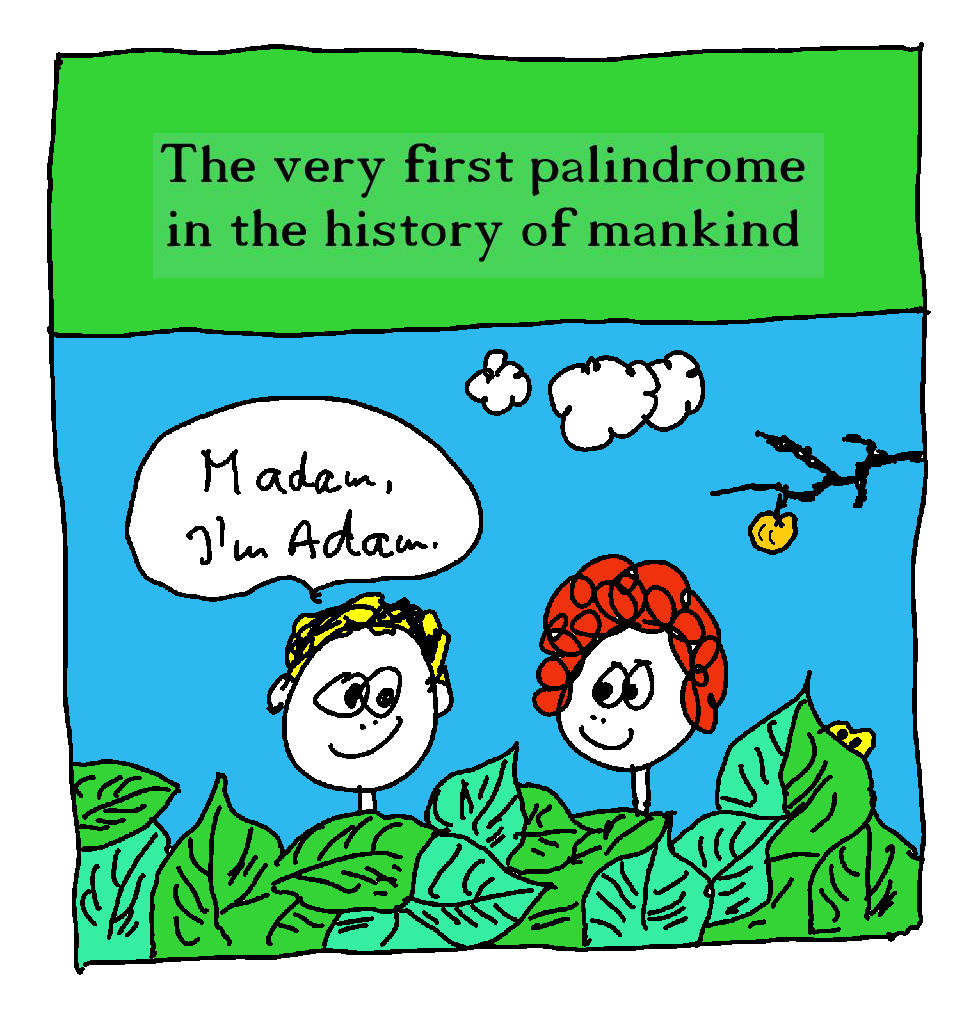
A cartoon using the palindrome "Madam, I'm Adam"

== Types ==
=== Characters, words, or lines ===
The most familiar palindromes in English are character-unit palindromes, where the characters read the same backward as forward. Examples are civic, radar, level, rotor, kayak, madam, and refer. The longest common ones are rotator, deified, racecar, and reviver; longer examples such as redivider, kinnikinnik, and tattarrattat are orders of magnitude rarer.

There are also word-unit palindromes in which the unit of reversal is the word ("Is it crazy how saying sentences backwards creates backwards sentences saying how crazy it is?"). Word-unit palindromes were made popular in the recreational linguistics community by J. A. Lindon in the 1960s. Occasional examples in English were created in the 19th century. Several in French and Latin date to the Middle Ages.

There are also line-unit palindromes, most often poems. These possess an initial set of lines which, precisely halfway through, is repeated in reverse order, without alteration to word order within each line, and in a way that the second half continues the "story" related in the first half in a way that makes sense, this last being key.

Example
Initial order	Reversed order
We can save the world I cannot believe that The world is doomed	The world is doomed I cannot believe that We can save the world

=== Sentences and phrases ===
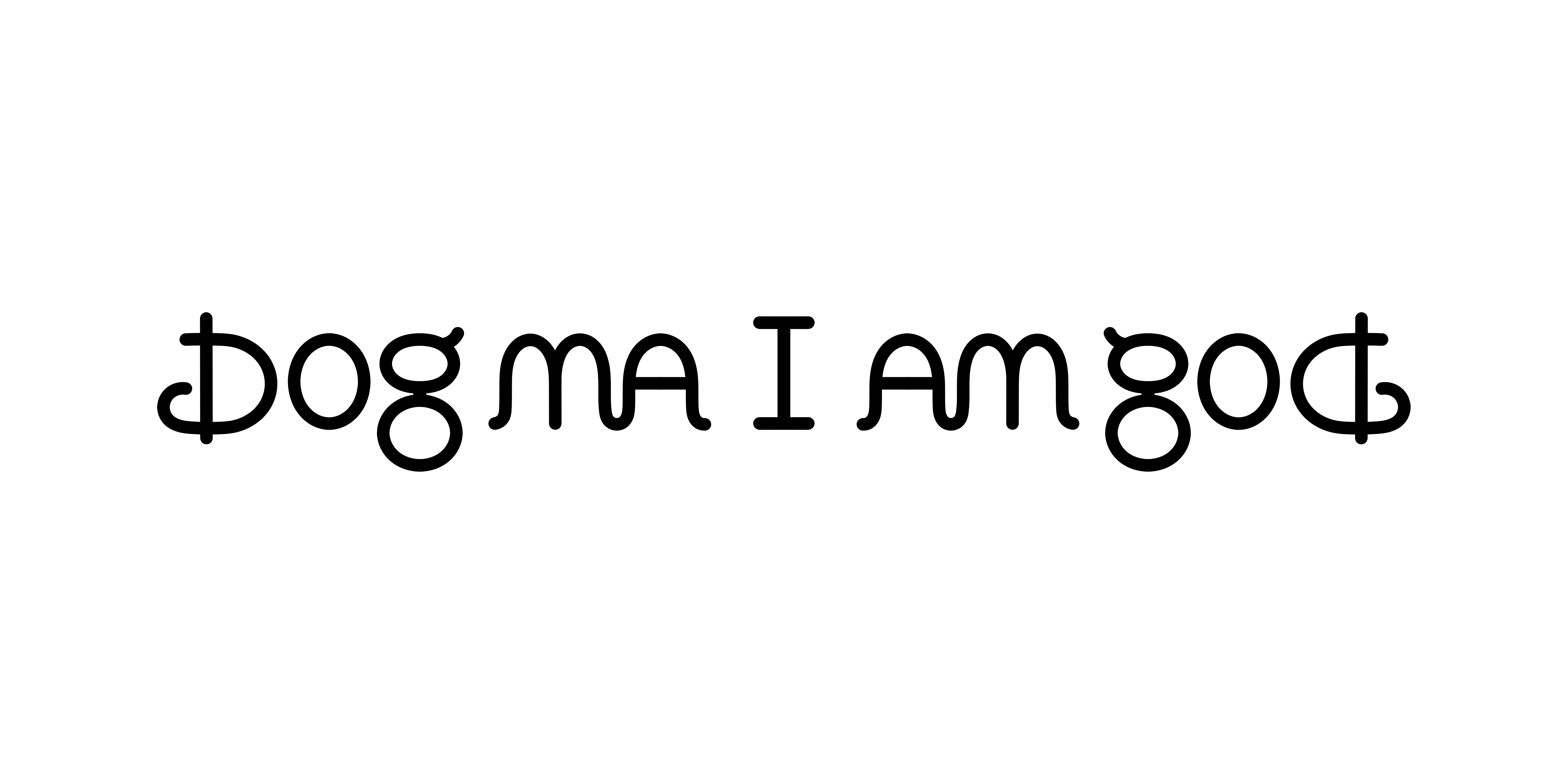
Ambigram of the palindrome "Dogma I am God"

Palindromes often consist of a sentence or phrase, e.g., "A man, a plan, a canal, Panama", "Mr. Owl ate my metal worm", "Do geese see God?", or "Was it a car or a cat I saw?". Punctuation, capitalization, and spaces are usually ignored. Some, such as "Rats live on no evil star", "Live on time, emit no evil", and "Step on no pets", include the spaces.

=== Names ===
Some names are palindromes, such as the given names Hannah, Ava, Aviva, Anna, Eve, Bob, and Otto, or the surnames Harrah, Renner, Salas, and Nenonen. Lon Nol (1913–1985) was Prime Minister of Cambodia. Nisio Isin is a Japanese novelist and manga writer, whose pseudonym (西尾 維新, Nishio Ishin) is a palindrome when romanized using the Kunrei-shiki or the Nihon-shiki systems, and is often written as NisiOisiN to emphasize this. Some people have changed their name in order to make it palindromic (including as the actor Robert Trebor and rock-vocalist Ola Salo), while others were given a palindromic name at birth (such as the philologist Revilo P. Oliver, the flamenco dancer Sara Baras, the runner Anuța Cătună, the creator of the Eden Project Tim Smit, and the Mexican racing driver Noel León).

There are also palindromic names in fictional media. "Stanley Yelnats" is the name of the main character in Holes, a 1998 novel and 2003 film. Five of the fictional Pokémon species have palindromic names in English (Eevee, Girafarig, Farigiraf, Ho-Oh, and Alomomola), as does the region Alola.

The 1970s pop band ABBA is a palindrome using the starting letter of the first name of each of the four band members.

=== Numbers ===
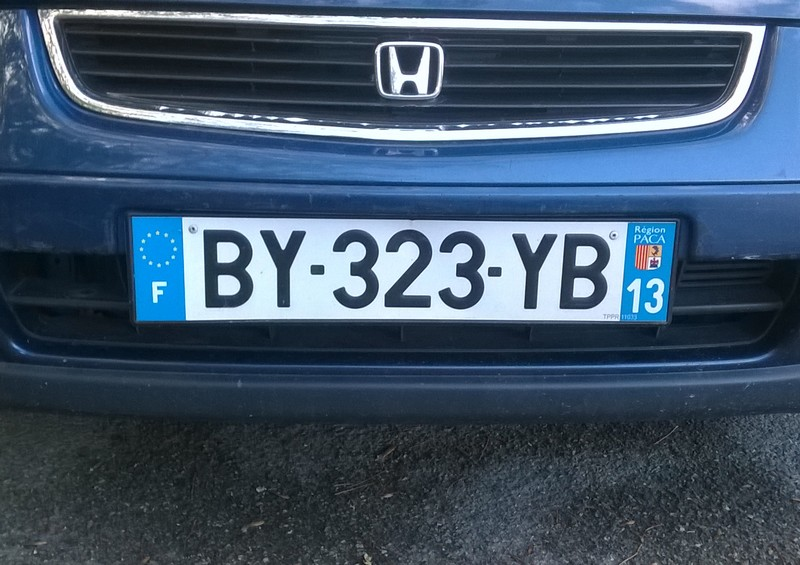
Palindromic license plate number

The digits of a palindromic number are the same read backwards as forwards, for example, 91019; decimal representation is usually assumed. In recreational mathematics, palindromic numbers with special properties are sought. For example, 191 and 313 are palindromic primes.

Whether Lychrel numbers exists is an unsolved problem in mathematics about whether there is a number that won't become a palindrome when it is continuously reversed and added. For example, 56 is not a Lychrel number as 56 + 65 = 121, and 121 is a palindrome. The number 59 becomes a palindrome after three iterations: 59 + 95 = 154; 154 + 451 = 605; 605 + 506 = 1111, so 59 is not a Lychrel number either. Numbers such as 196 are thought to never become palindromes when this reversal process is carried out and are therefore suspected of being Lychrel numbers. If a number is not a Lychrel number, it is called a "delayed palindrome" (56 has a delay of 1 and 59 has a delay of 3). In January 2017 the number 1,999,291,987,030,606,810 was published in OEIS as A281509, and described as "The Largest Known Most Delayed Palindrome", with a delay of 261. Several smaller 261-delay palindromes were published separately as A281508.

Every positive integer can be written as the sum of three palindromic numbers in every number system with base 5 or greater.

=== Dates ===
A day or timestamp is a palindrome when its digits are the same when reversed. Only the digits are considered in this determination and the component separators (hyphens, slashes, and dots) are ignored. Short digits may be used as in 11/11/11 11:11 or long digits as in 2 February 2020.

A notable palindrome day is this century's 2 February 2020 because this date is a palindrome regardless of the date format by country (yyyy-mm-dd, dd-mm-yyyy, or mm-dd-yyyy) used in various countries. For this reason, this date has also been termed as a "Universal Palindrome Day". Other universal palindrome days include, almost a millennium previously, 11/11/1111, the future 12/12/2121, and in a millennium 03/03/3030.

=== In speech ===
"Une Slave valse nue" played forward and backward

A phonetic palindrome is a portion of speech that is identical or roughly identical when reversed. It can arise in context where language is played with, for example in slang dialects like verlan. In the French language, there is the phrase une Slave valse nue ('a Slavic woman waltzes naked'), phonetically [yn slav vals ny]. John Oswald discussed his experience of phonetic palindromes while working on audio tape versions of the cut-up technique using recorded readings by William S. Burroughs. A list of phonetic palindromes discussed by word puzzle columnist O.V. Michaelsen (Ove Ofteness) include "crew work"/"work crew", "dry yard", "easy", "Funny enough", "Let Bob tell", "new moon", "selfless", "Sorry, Ross", "Talk, Scott", "to boot", "top spot" (also an orthographic palindrome), "Y'all lie", "You're caught. Talk, Roy", and "You're damn mad, Roy".

== Longest palindromes ==
The longest single-word palindrome in the Oxford English Dictionary is the 12-letter onomatopoeic word tattarrattat, coined by James Joyce in Ulysses (1922) for a knock on the door. The Guinness Book of Records gives the title to the 11-letter detartrated, the preterite and past participle of detartrate, a chemical term meaning to remove tartrates. The 9-letter word Rotavator, a trademarked name for an agricultural machine, is listed in dictionaries as being the longest single-word palindrome. The 9-letter term redivider is used by some writers, but appears to be an invented or derived term; only redivide and redivision appear in the Shorter Oxford English Dictionary; the 9-letter word Malayalam, a language of southern India, is also of equal length.

According to Guinness World Records, the Finnish 19-letter word saippuakivikauppias (a soapstone vendor), is the world's longest palindromic word in everyday use.

English palindrome sentences of notable length include mathematician Peter Hilton's "Doc, note: I dissent. A fast never prevents a fatness. I diet on cod", and Scottish poet Alastair Reid's "T. Eliot, top bard, notes putrid tang emanating, is sad; I'd assign it a name: gnat dirt upset on drab pot toilet."

In English, two palindromic novels have been published: Satire: Veritas by David Stephens (1980, 58,795 letters), and Dr Awkward & Olson in Oslo by Lawrence Levine (1986, 31,954 words). Another palindromic English work is a 224-word long poem, "Dammit I'm Mad", written by Demetri Martin. "Weird Al" Yankovic's song "Bob" is composed entirely of palindromes. In a different style of palindromic novel, Jon Agee's 144-page book Otto: A Palindrama is a Graphic novel where each of the 200 text boxes is a palindrome.

== Other occurrences ==
=== Classical music ===
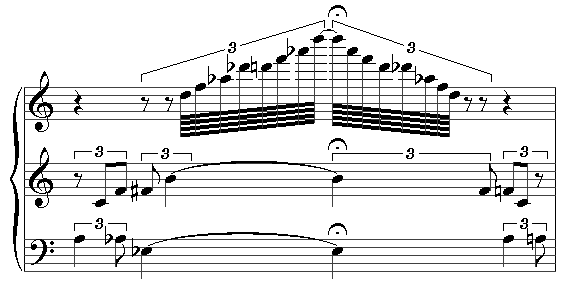
Centre part of palindrome in Alban Berg's opera Lulu

Joseph Haydn's Symphony No. 47 in G is nicknamed "the Palindrome". In the third movement, a minuet and trio, the second half of the minuet is the same as the first but backwards, the second half of the ensuing trio similarly reflects the first half, and then the minuet is repeated.

The interlude from Alban Berg's opera Lulu is a palindrome, as are sections and pieces, in arch form, by many other composers, including James Tenney, and most famously Béla Bartók. George Crumb also used musical palindrome to text paint the Federico García Lorca poem "¿Por qué nací?", the first movement of three in his fourth book of Madrigals. Igor Stravinsky's final composition, The Owl and the Pussy Cat, is a palindrome.

The first movement from Constant Lambert's ballet Horoscope (1938) is entitled "Palindromic Prelude". Lambert claimed that the theme was dictated to him by the ghost of Bernard van Dieren, who had died in 1936.

British composer Robert Simpson also composed music in the palindrome or based on palindromic themes; the slow movement of his Symphony No. 2 is a palindrome, as is the slow movement of his String Quartet No. 1. His hour-long String Quartet No. 9 consists of thirty-two variations and a fugue on a palindromic theme of Haydn (from the minuet of his Symphony No. 47). All of Simpson's thirty-two variations are themselves palindromic.

Hin und Zurück ("There and Back": 1927) is an operatic 'sketch' (Op. 45a) in one scene by Paul Hindemith, with a German libretto by Marcellus Schiffer. It is essentially a dramatic palindrome. Through the first half, a tragedy unfolds between two lovers, involving jealousy, murder and suicide. Then, in the reversing second half, this is replayed with the lines sung in reverse order to produce a happy ending.

The music of Anton Webern is often palindromic. Webern, who had studied the music of the Renaissance composer Heinrich Isaac, was extremely interested in symmetries in music, be they horizontal or vertical. An example of horizontal or linear symmetry in Webern's music is the first phrase in the second movement of the symphony, Op. 21. A striking example of vertical symmetry is the second movement of the Piano Variations, Op. 27, in which Webern arranges every pitch of this dodecaphonic work around the central pitch axis of A4. From this, each downward reaching interval is replicated exactly in the opposite direction. For example, a G♯3—13 half-steps down from A4 is replicated as a B♭5—13 half-steps above.

Just as the letters of a verbal palindrome are not reversed, so are the elements of a musical palindrome usually presented in the same form in both halves. Although these elements are usually single notes, palindromes may be made using more complex elements. For example, Karlheinz Stockhausen's composition Mixtur, originally written in 1964, consists of twenty sections, called "moments", which may be permuted in several different ways, including retrograde presentation, and two versions may be made in a single program. When the composer revised the work in 2003, he prescribed such a palindromic performance, with the twenty moments first played in a "forwards" version, and then "backwards". Each moment is a complex musical unit and is played in the same direction in each half of the program. By contrast, Karel Goeyvaerts's 1953 electronic composition, Nummer 5 (met zuivere tonen) is an exact palindrome: not only does each event in the second half of the piece occur according to an axis of symmetry at the centre of the work, but each event itself is reversed, so that the note attacks in the first half become note decays in the second, and vice versa. It is a perfect example of Goeyvaerts's aesthetics, the perfect example of the imperfection of perfection.

In classical music, a crab canon is a canon in which one line of the melody is reversed in time and pitch from the other. A large-scale musical palindrome covering more than one movement is called "chiastic", referring to the cross-shaped Greek letter "χ" (pronounced /ˈkaɪ/.) This is usually a form of reference to the crucifixion; for example, the Crucifixus movement of Bach's Mass in B minor. The purpose of such palindromic balancing is to focus the listener on the central movement, much as one would focus on the centre of the cross in the crucifixion. Other examples are found in Bach's cantata BWV 4, Christ lag in Todes Banden, Handel's Messiah and Fauré's Requiem.

A table canon is a rectangular piece of sheet music intended to be played by two musicians facing each other across a table with the music between them, with one musician viewing the music upside down compared to the other. The result is somewhat like two speakers simultaneously reading the Sator Square from opposite sides, except that it is typically in two-part polyphony rather than in unison.

=== Biological structures ===
Palindrome of DNA structure A: Palindrome, B: Loop, C: Stem

Palindromic motifs are found in most genomes or sets of genetic instructions. The meaning of palindrome in the context of genetics is slightly different, from the definition used for words and sentences. Since the DNA is formed by two paired strands of nucleotides, and the nucleotides always pair in the same way (Adenine (A) with Thymine (T), Cytosine (C) with Guanine (G)), a (single-stranded) sequence of DNA is said to be a palindrome if it is equal to its complementary sequence read backward. For example, the sequence ACCTAGGT is palindromic because its complement is TGGATCCA, which is equal to the original sequence in reverse complement.

A palindromic DNA sequence may form a hairpin. Palindromic motifs are made by the order of the nucleotides that specify the complex chemicals (proteins) that, as a result of those genetic instructions, the cell is to produce. They have been specially researched in bacterial chromosomes and in the so-called Bacterial Interspersed Mosaic Elements (BIMEs) scattered over them. In 2003, a research genome sequencing project discovered that many of the bases on the Y-chromosome are arranged as palindromes. A palindrome structure allows the Y-chromosome to repair itself by bending over at the middle if one side is damaged.

It is believed that palindromes are also found in proteins, but their role in the protein function is not clearly known. It has been suggested in 2008 that the prevalent existence of palindromes in peptides might be related to the prevalence of low-complexity regions in proteins, as palindromes frequently are associated with low-complexity sequences. Their prevalence might also be related to an alpha helical formation propensity of these sequences, or in formation of protein/protein complexes.

=== Computation theory ===
In automata theory, a set of all palindromes in a given alphabet is a typical example of a language that is context-free, but not regular. This means that it is impossible for a finite automaton to reliably test for palindromes.

In addition, the set of palindromes may not be reliably tested by a deterministic pushdown automaton which also means that they are not LR(k)-parsable or LL(k)-parsable. When reading a palindrome from left to right, it is, in essence, impossible to locate the "middle" until the entire word has been read completely.

It is possible to find the longest palindromic substring of a given input string in linear time.

The palindromic density of an infinite word w over an alphabet A is defined to be zero if only finitely many prefixes are palindromes; otherwise, letting the palindromic prefixes be of lengths n_{k} for k=1,2,... we define the density to be

$$d_P(w) = \left( { \limsup_{k \rightarrow \infty} \frac{n_{k+1}}{n_k} } \right)^{-1} \ .$$

Among aperiodic words, the largest possible palindromic density is achieved by the Fibonacci word, which has density 1/φ, where φ is the Golden ratio.

A palstar is a concatenation of palindromic strings, excluding the trivial one-letter palindromes – otherwise all strings would be palstars.

== Notable palindromists ==
- Jon Agee (b. 1960)
- Dmitry Avaliani (1938–2003)
- Howard W. Bergerson (1922–2011)
- Hugo Brandt Corstius (1935–2014)
- Noam Dovev (b. 1974)
- Anthony Etherin (b. 1981)
- Simo Frangén (b. 1963)
- Baby Gramps (active 1964–present)
- Pasi Heikura (b. 1963)
- Peter Hilton (1923–2010)
- Hucbald (850-930)
- Su Hui (poet) (fourth century CE)
- Velimir Khlebnikov (1885–1922)
- Ilmar Laaban (1921–2000)
- J. A. Lindon (c. 1914–1979)
- Demetri Martin (b. 1973)
- Rabanus Maurus (780-856)
- Leigh Mercer (1893–1977) best known for devising the palindrome "A man, a plan, a canal: Panama!"
- Georges Perec (1936–1982)
- Mark Saltveit (b. 1961)
- Sedulius Scottus (flourished 840–860)

== See also ==
=== Related topics ===
- Alternade
- Ambigram
- Anadrome
- Anagram
- Ananym
- Anastrophe
- Antimetabole
- Backmasking
- Chiasmus
- Constrained writing
- Eodermdrome
- Kaibun
- Mirror writing
- Palindromic number
- Palindromic sequence
- Reversible poem

=== Related cases ===
- List of English palindromic phrases
- List of palindromic places
- Palindroma, a genus of spiders with palindromic species names
- Palindromic polynomial
- Yreka, California, which has the palindromic Yreka Bakery and Yrella Gallery
