= Kaibun =

Japanese equivalent of a palindrome

Kaibun (Japanese: 回文, 廻文 or かいぶん, lit. 'circle sentence') is the Japanese equivalent of the palindrome, or in other words, a sentence that reads the same from the beginning to the end or from the end to the beginning. The unit of kaibun is mora, since the Japanese language uses syllabaries, hiragana and katakana.

Single-word palindromes are not uncommon in Japanese. For example, Ku-ku (九九, multiplication table), Shi-n-bu-n-shi (新聞紙, newspaper), to-ma-to (トマト, tomato), etc. Kaibun usually refers to a palindromic sentence, but a passage can be a kaibun too.

The topic marker wa (は) can be treated as ha and small kana ゃ, ゅ and ょ are usually allowed to be interpreted as big kana や, ゆ and よ. In classics, diacritic marks are often ignored.

Rather than saying "read the same forwards and backwards", because Japanese is traditionally written vertically, Japanese people describe the words as being the same when read from the top (ue kara yomu, Japanese: 上から読む) as when read from the bottom (shita kara yomu, Japanese: 下から読む).

== Famous kaibun ==
- Ta-ke-ya-bu ya-ke-ta (竹薮焼けた) - A bamboo grove has been burned.
- Wa-ta-shi ma-ke-ma-shi-ta-wa (私負けましたわ) - I have lost.
- Na-ru-to wo to-ru-na (なるとを取るな) - Do not take my naruto (spiral-shaped fishcake).
- Da-n-su-ga su-n-da (ダンスが済んだ) - The dance is over.
- Shi-na-mo-n pa-n mo re-mo-n pa-n mo na-shi (シナモンパンもレモンパンも無し) - There is neither cinnamon bread nor lemon bread.
- Na-ga-ki yo-no to-ho-no ne-bu-ri-no mi-na me-za-me na-mi-no-ri-bu-ne-no o-to-no-yo-ki-ka-na (長き世の 遠の眠りの 皆目覚め 波乗り船の 音の良きかな) Tanka - Everybody gets awakened from a long sleep and enjoys the sound of waves on which the boat is gliding along.
- Yo-no-na-ka, ho-ka-ho-ka na-no-yo (世の中、ホカホカなのよ) - The world is a warm place.
- Yo-no-na-ka-ne, ka-o-ka o-ka-ne-ka na-no-yo (世の中ね、顔かお金かなのよ) - In this world, it's either looks or money.
