= Bob ("Weird Al" Yankovic song) =

2003 "Weird Al" Yankovic song

- Title card for the video for "Bob", which parodies style elements of the Bob Dylan video for "Subterranean Homesick Blues".

Song by "Weird Al" Yankovic

from the album Poodle Hat
- Released: May 20, 2003 (as part of Poodle Hat)
- Recorded: March 26, 2002
- Genre: Comedy; parody
- Label: Volcano
- Songwriter: "Weird Al" Yankovic
- Producer: "Weird Al" Yankovic

Music video
- "Weird Al" Yankovic – "Bob" on YouTube

"Bob" is a song by "Weird Al" Yankovic from the 2003 album Poodle Hat. The song is a parody sung in the style of Bob Dylan, and each line of the lyrics is a palindrome, as is the title. For example, the song's first line is "I, man, am regal—a German am I".

The song did not chart at the time of its release, but later became the subject of critical and scholarly examination. Music critic Nathan Rabin argues that the song's lyrics "sound cryptic enough to be genuine Dylanesque, but are in fact palindromes delivered in an uncanny re-creation of Dylan's nasal whine." Randall Auxier and Douglas R. Anderson described Yankovic as having "bested" Dylan with the song, in a hypothetical competition.

== Composition and style ==
"Bob" was written and recorded by Yankovic in 2002 and was "in part inspired by the year 2002, itself a palindrome". In an interview with musicologist Lily E. Hirsch, Yankovic used the song as an illustration of his writing process, noting that he put together the lyrics before deciding to do the song in the style of Dylan:

Yankovic thought, "Well, I wonder if I could write a song completely out of palindromes? ... So I started putting the rhymes together and putting the verses together and basically making a poem out of these palindromes." He continued, "And I looked at them and I thought, 'Well, this ... this is really just a random jumble, but it looks like it should mean something.'" The pseudo-poetic nonsense struck him as similar to the lyrical invention of Bob Dylan.

Using Dylan as the template for the song style also allowed Yankovic to use Dylan's first name, itself a palindrome, as the title. The song is described as "a style parody that responds to Dylan's sound (particularly his mid-1960s sound) and to the befuddling nature of some of his lyrics". Although the music video alludes to "Subterranean Homesick Blues", "the musical style of 'Bob' is closer to Dylan's 'Tombstone Blues'". Yankovic "plays on the famous inscrutability of Dylan's 1960s lyrics by composing his parody entirely from palindromes", while his performance "replicates a musical style associated with Bob Dylan—harmonica, a pronounced nasal voice, and vocal attacks marked by scooping", the latter being a musical technique of singing the note slightly below the desired pitch, and then sliding up to it. Another examination found that "Yankovic's vocal timbre, attack, phrasing and rhythm make the song convincingly Dylanesque, while the rhyming palindromes provide a structuring logic to the song and provide it with its own sense even as it makes no sense semantically". The A.V. Club found the song to be "very much in the Bowser & Blue tradition, imitating the sound of Dylan's classic recordings and poking fun at his penchant for nonsensical lyrics".

In 2013, Yankovic served as a guest judge in a palindrome contest. Noting that "Oozy rat in a sanitary zoo", a line in the song, was a personal favorite of his, he said, "The writing of a brilliant palindrome is a small miracle", which "deserves to be honored more than a lot of the stupid and inconsequential things we often celebrate in our culture".

== Music video ==
The music video alludes to the clip of Dylan's song "Subterranean Homesick Blues" in the 1967 D. A. Pennebaker documentary Dont Look Back. The video for "Bob" is similarly shot in black-and-white, and in the same back-alley setting, with Yankovic dressing as Dylan and dropping cue cards that have the song's lyrics on them, as Dylan did in the film. The video features cameo appearances by Yankovic's drummer Jon "Bermuda" Schwartz and frequent Yankovic video director Jay Levey, standing in the same positions as Allen Ginsberg and Bob Neuwirth in the Dylan video.

"Bob" was the only song on the album for which a video was made; plans had been made to film a video for the Eminem parody "Couch Potato", but while the work was in pre-production, Eminem refused permission for Yankovic to make the video. So that the album would not be without a video, a quick one for "Bob" was shot and used on the tour and for the 2003 edition of Al TV. The video for "Bob" was subsequently released on "Weird Al" Yankovic: The Ultimate Video Collection DVD (2003).

== Personnel ==
According to the liner notes of The Essential "Weird Al" Yankovic:

- "Weird Al" Yankovic – lead & background vocals
- Jim West – guitars
- Steve Jay – bass guitar
- Jon "Bermuda" Schwartz – drums, tambourine
- Rubén Valtierra – piano
- Will Anderson – harmonica

== See also ==
- "I Palindrome I", 1992 song by They Might Be Giants
- Duo Palindrome 2002, Volumes 1 and 2, albums by drummer Andrew Cyrille and multi-instrumentalist Anthony Braxton
- List of English palindromic phrases
