= Nipson anomēmata mē monan opsin =

Greek palindrome

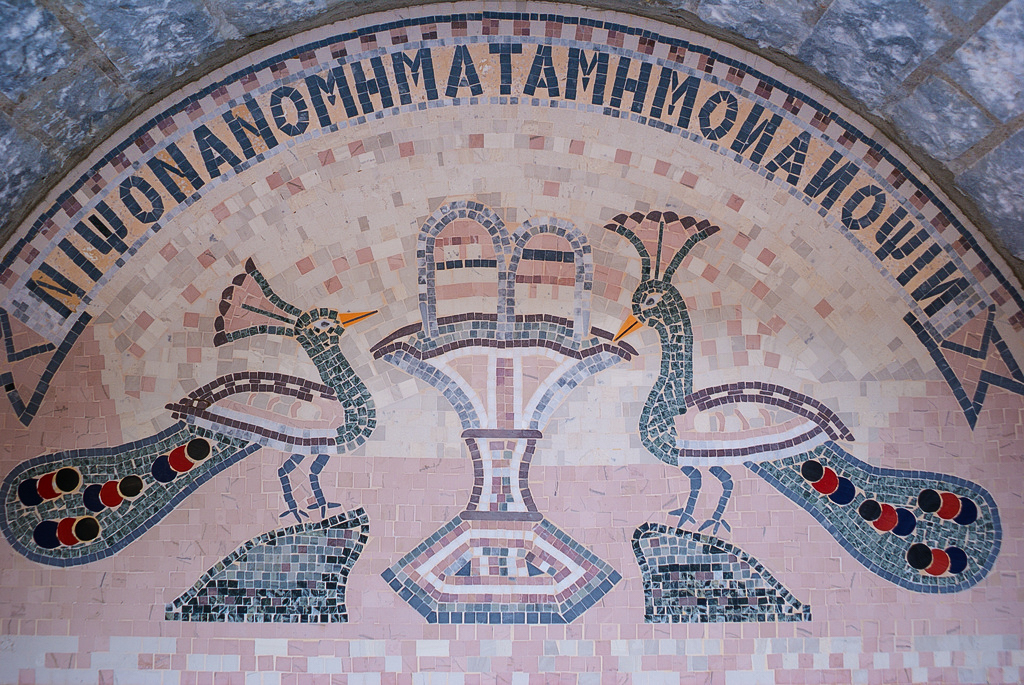
ΝΙΨΟΝ ΑΝΟΜΗΜΑΤΑ ΜΗ ΜΟΝΑΝ ΟΨΙΝ (translation: Wash your sins, not only your face) in the monastery of Panayia Malevi.

Nipson anomēmata mē monan opsin (Ancient Greek: Νίψον ἀνομήματα, μὴ μόναν ὄψιν), meaning "Wash the sins, not only the face", or "Wash my transgressions, not only my face", is a Greek palindrome (Note: The romanization is not a palindrome because the Greek letter ψ (psi) is transcribed by the digraph ps. The modern diacritics, which are not symmetrical, are usually omitted from inscriptions of the sentence.) that is said to be first inscribed upon a holy water font outside the Hagia Sophia in Constantinople.

== Origin ==
The phrase is attributed to the fourth-century Saint Gregory of Nazianzus.

When the sentence is rendered in capital letters, as would be usual for an inscription (ΝΙΨΟΝΑΝΟΜΗΜΑΤΑΜΗΜΟΝΑΝΟΨΙΝ), all the letters are vertically symmetrical except for the Ν. As a result, if the N is stylized Ͷ in the right half (ΝΙΨΟΝΑΝΟΜΗΜΑΤΑΜΗΜΟͶΑͶΟΨΙͶ), the sentence is not only a palindrome but also a mirror ambigram.

== Examples ==
Examples of the inscription

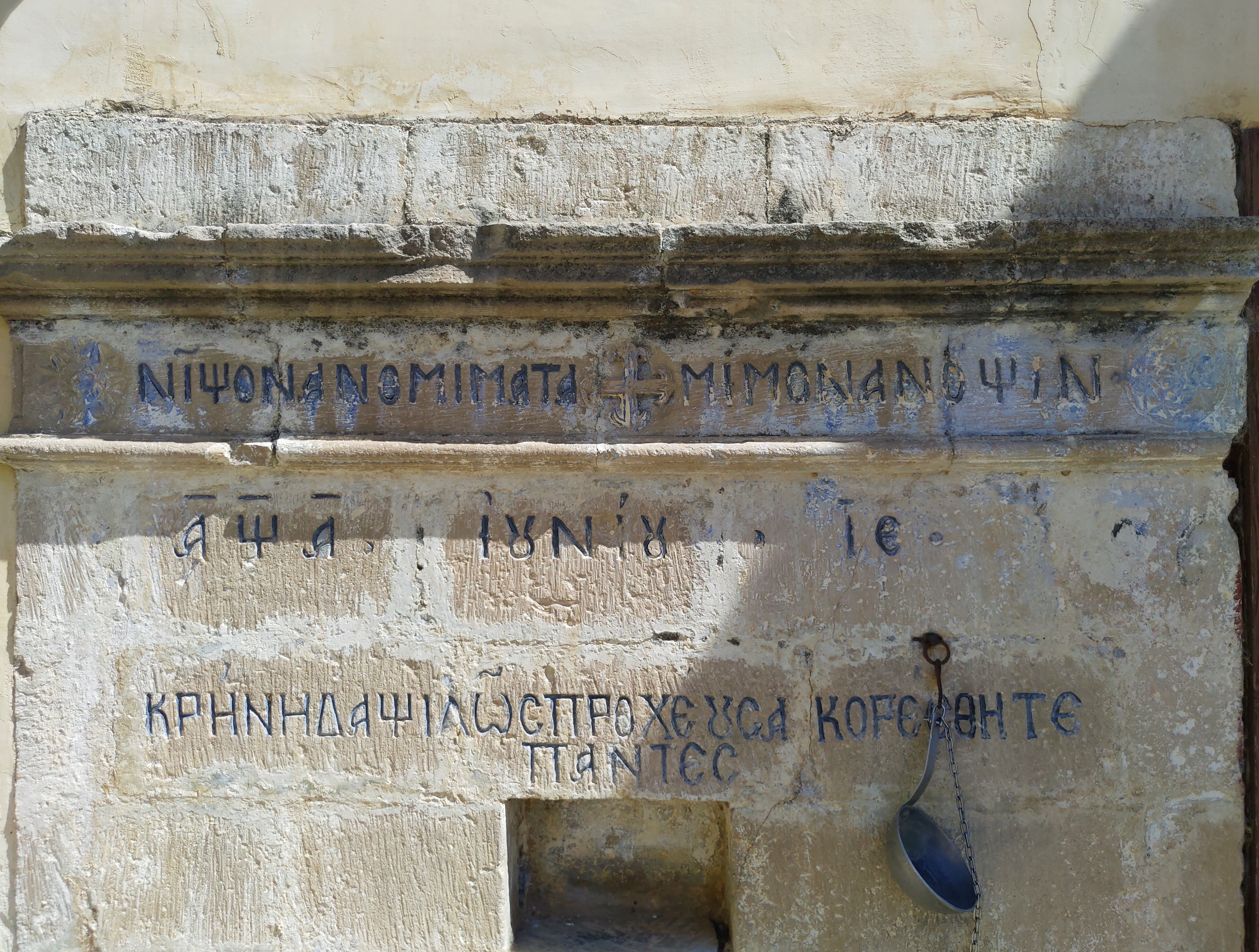
Preveli Monastery, Crete, Greece

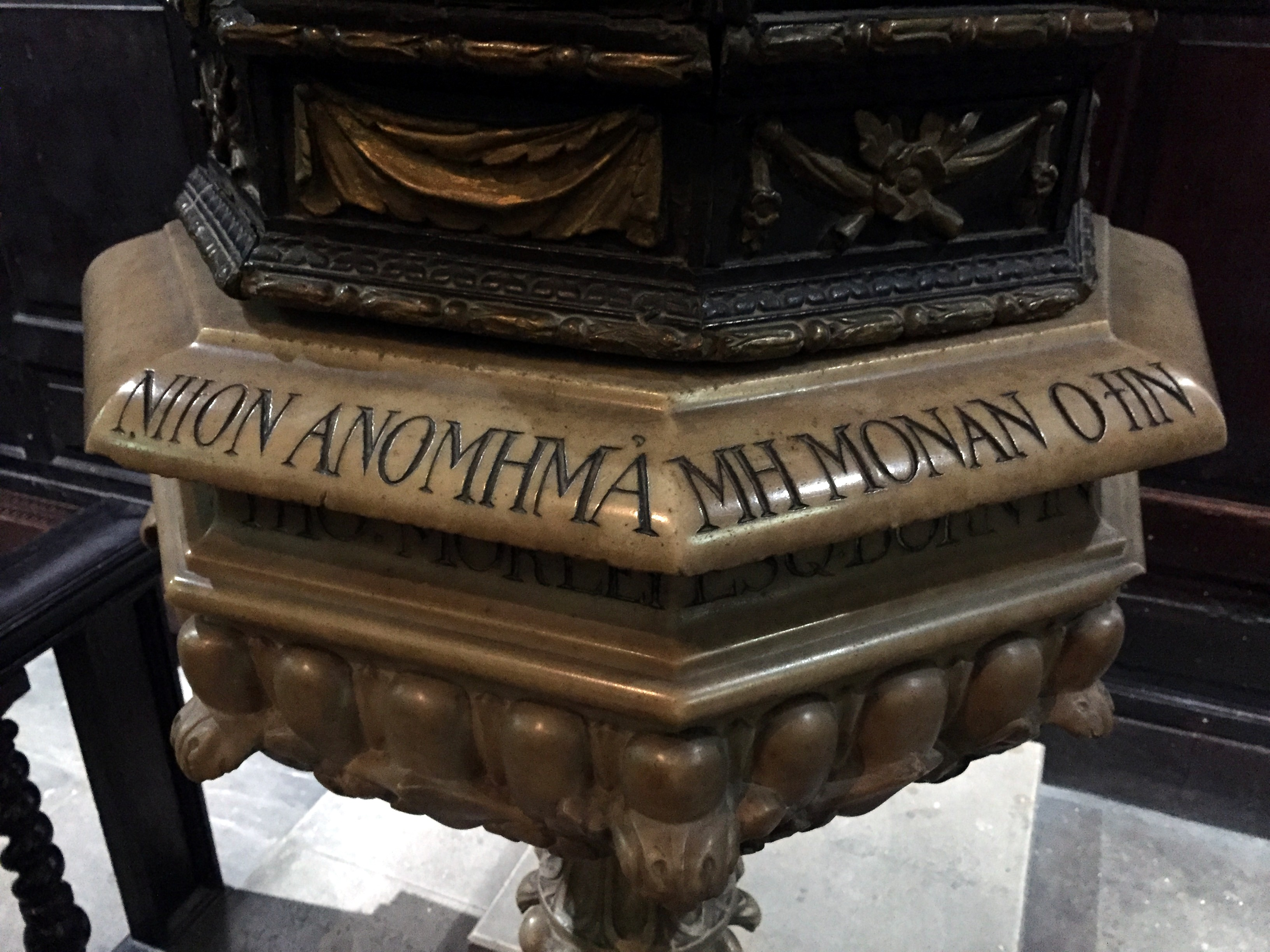
Baptismal font, St Martin's Church, Ludgate. The phrase remains a Greek palindrome with the singular anomema.

The inscription can also be found in the following places:

- above the Hagiasma ("Holy Spring") of the Church of St. Mary of Blachernae in Istanbul;
- around the baptismal font at St. Michael's Cathedral in Barbados;
- at the Vlatadon Monastery, Thessaloniki, Greece.
- at a fountain inside the church Panagia Ekatontapiliani in Parikia on the island Paros, Greece
- the font of several churches in Paris, including: St. Stephen d’Egres, Saint-Vincent-de-Paul, Paris, St. Martin des Champs, St. Pierre de Chaillot, and Basilica of Notre-Dame-des-Victoires, Paris;
- in several churches in Britain, including: St. Mary's Church, Nottingham, Tewkesbury Abbey (Gloucestershire), Worlingworth (Suffolk), Harlow (Essex), Knapton (Norfolk), St Martin, Ludgate (London), St Ethelburga's Bishopsgate (London), Sandbach (Cheshire), and Hadleigh (Suffolk);

== See also ==
- List of Greek phrases
- Sator square
