= Dont Look Back =

1967 documentary film directed by D. A. Pennebaker

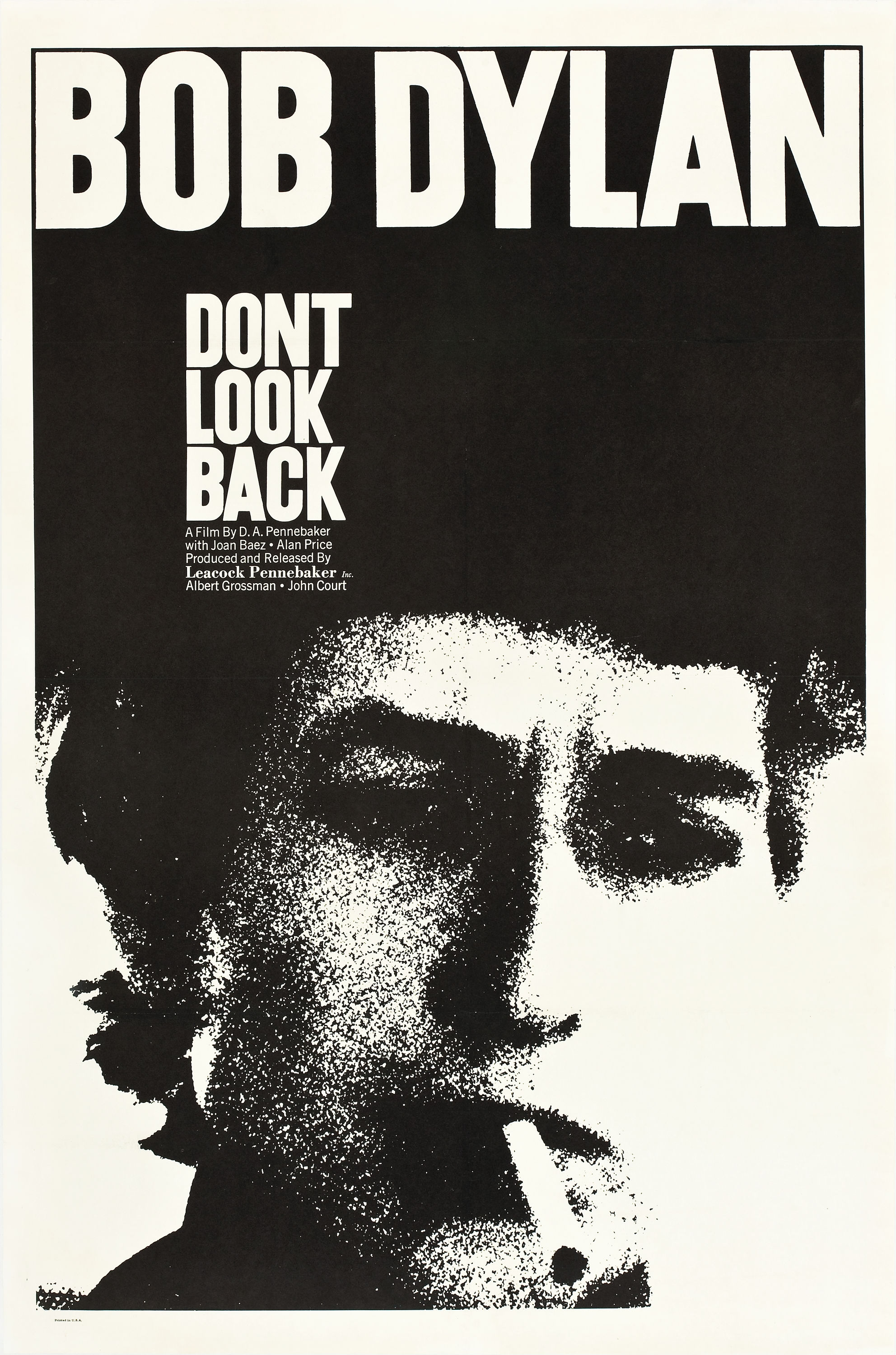
- Theatrical release poster
- Directed by: D. A. Pennebaker
- Written by: D. A. Pennebaker
- Produced by: John Court; Albert Grossman
- Starring: Bob Dylan; Joan Baez; Alan Price
- Edited by: D. A. Pennebaker
- Music by: Bob Dylan; Donovan
- Production companies: Leacock-Pennebaker, Inc.
- Distributed by: Leacock-Pennebaker, Inc.
- Release date: May 17, 1967
- Running time: 96 minutes
- Country: United States

Dont Look Back is a 1967 American documentary film directed by D. A. Pennebaker that covers Bob Dylan's 1965 tour of England.

In 1998, the film was selected for preservation in the United States National Film Registry by the Library of Congress as being deemed "culturally, historically, or aesthetically significant". In a 2014 Sight & Sound poll, film critics voted Dont Look Back the joint ninth best documentary film of all time.

== Synopsis ==
The opening scene of the film has Bob Dylan displaying and discarding a series of cue cards bearing selected words and phrases from the lyrics to his 1965 song "Subterranean Homesick Blues" (including intentional misspellings and puns). This was the first single from his most recent album, Bringing It All Back Home, and a top ten hit in the UK when he filmed it there (a fact discussed in the film). Allen Ginsberg appears in the background, having a discussion with Dylan's road manager Bob Neuwirth.

The film features Joan Baez, Donovan, Alan Price (who had just left the Animals), Dylan's manager Albert Grossman, and Neuwirth. Marianne Faithfull, John Mayall, Ginger Baker, and Ginsberg may also be glimpsed in the background. Notable scenes include:

- Dylan and Baez singing Hank Williams songs in a hotel room, and Baez singing the first few verses of "Sally Go 'Round the Roses", "Percy's Song", and "Love Is Just a Four-Letter Word" (which was still apparently unfinished at the time, as Baez later tells Dylan, "If you finish it I'll sing it on a record"; she would record it on Any Day Now in 1968).
- Dylan arguing with a "science student" (producer Terry Ellis, who later co-founded Chrysalis Records) before a concert.
- Grossman negotiating with former dance band leader and music agent Tito Burns.
- Dylan singing "Only a Pawn in Their Game" on July 6, 1963, at a Voters' Registration Rally in Greenwood, Mississippi (shot by Ed Emshwiller).
- Dylan's interrupting Price's backstage performance of "Little Things" to ask Price why he left the Animals.
- Dylan's extended taunting of Time's London arts and science correspondent Horace Freeland Judson during an interview.
- A selection of songs from Dylan's performances at the Royal Albert Hall in London.
- Dylan playing "It's All Over Now, Baby Blue" at Donovan's request after proclaiming "Hey, that's a good song, man!" during Donovan's performance of "To Sing for You".

== Cast ==
=== Credited ===
- Bob Dylan
- Albert Grossman
- Bob Neuwirth
- Joan Baez
- Alan Price
- Tito Burns
- Donovan
- Derroll Adams

=== Uncredited ===
- Howard Alk
- Jones Alk
- Chris Ellis
- Terry Ellis
- Marianne Faithfull
- Allen Ginsberg
- Dorris Henderson
- John Mayall
- Brian Pendleton
- John Renbourn
- Tom Wilson

== Title ==
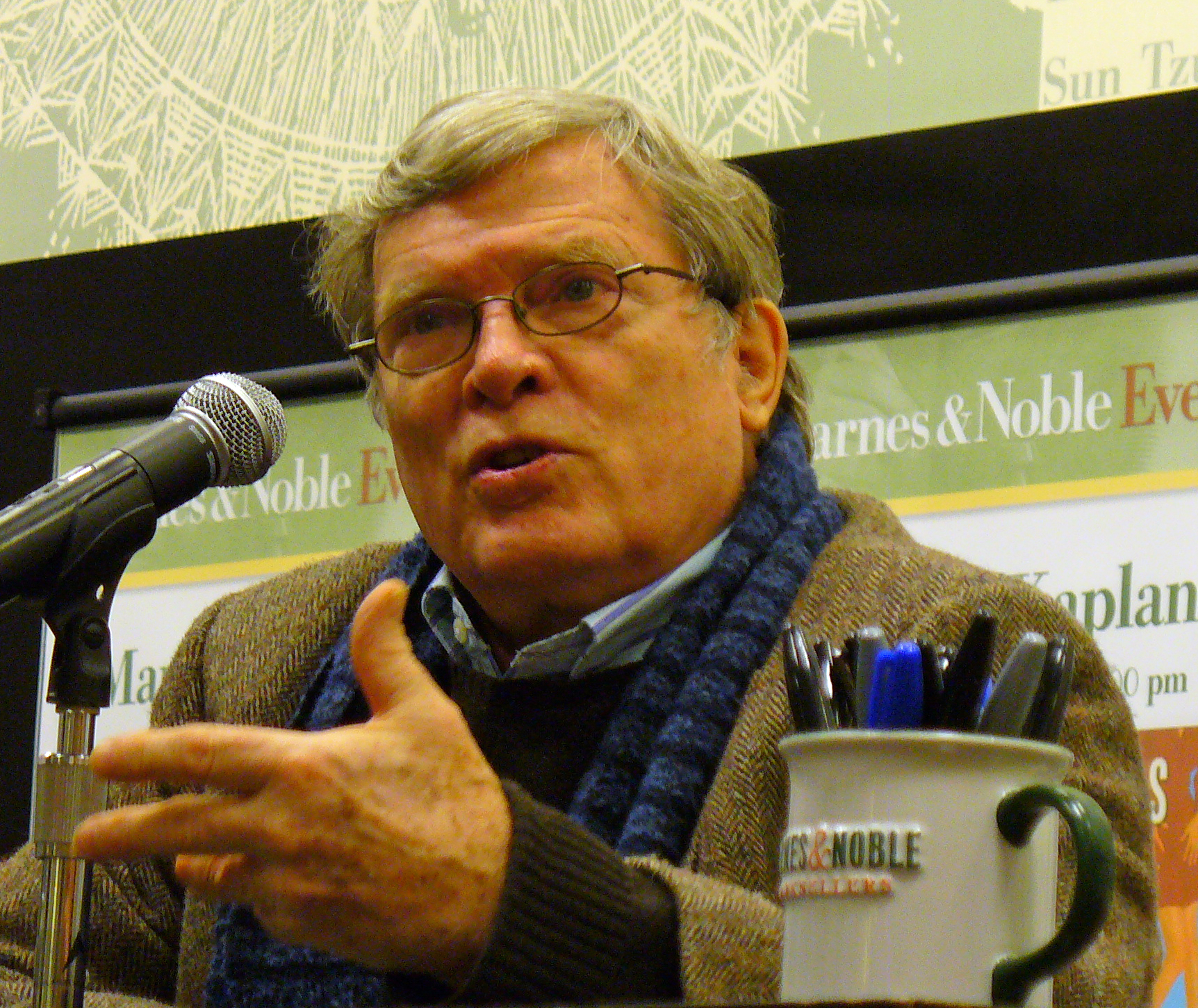
D. A. Pennebaker speaking at DVD re-release event on February 27, 2007

The original title of the film is Dont Look Back, without an apostrophe. Pennebaker decided to punctuate the title this way as an "attempt to simplify the language". Many sources have assumed this to be a typographical error and have "corrected" the title to Don't Look Back. In the commentary track to the DVD release, Pennebaker said that the title came from the Satchel Paige quote, "Don't look back. Something might be gaining on you," and that Dylan shared this view.

== Production ==
Dont Look Back was shot in black-and-white with a handheld 16mm-film camera and utilized direct sound, thus creating the template for the "rockumentary" film genre. Production began when Dylan arrived in England on April 26, 1965, and ended shortly after his final concert of the tour at the Royal Albert Hall on May 10. Pennebaker has stated that the famous "Subterranean Homesick Blues" music video that is shown at the beginning of the film was actually shot at the very end of filming; Pennebaker decided during editing to place it at the beginning of the film as a "stage" for Dylan to begin the film.

== Release ==
The film was first shown publicly May 17, 1967, at the Presidio Theater in San Francisco, and opened that September at the 34th Street East Theater in New York.

A transcript of the film, with photographs, was published in 1968 by Ballantine Books.

== Reception and legacy ==
Dont Look Back has been very well received by critics. It has an approval rating of 91% on Rotten Tomatoes based on 55 reviews. The website's critics' consensus reads: "Dont [sic] Look Back leaves the mysteries of Dylan largely intact while offering a gripping verite-style account of a pivotal moment in his incredible career." The film received a 5-star review from AllMovie and has a Metacritic score of 84, indicating "universal acclaim". In August 1967, a Newsweek reviewer wrote, "Dont Look Back is really about fame and how it menaces art, about the press and how it categorizes, bowdlerizes, sterilizes, universalizes or conventionalizes an original like Dylan into something it can dimly understand".

Kurt Cobain identified it as the only "good documentary about rock and roll" in a 1991 interview with his Nirvana bandmates, a sentiment with which Dave Grohl concurred.

The film has been parodied and paid homage to by many other films and television shows, including This Is Spinal Tap, All You Need Is Cash, Bob Roberts, and Documentary Now!. The opening sequence has inspired many music videos, including INXS' "Mediate", MC Evidence's "The Far Left," "Weird Al" Yankovic's "Bob", Hozier's "Almost (Sweet Music)", Kim Gordon's "Bye Bye 25", and Margo Price's "Don't Wake Me Up", and was cited by journalist Roger Friedman as "the most copied, most revered, music video of all time".

=== Home media ===
Dont Look Back has been released and re-released on home video in many formats, from VHS to Blu-ray, over the decades. A digitally remastered deluxe DVD edition was released on February 27, 2007. The two-disc edition contained the remastered film, five additional audio tracks, commentary by filmmaker D. A. Pennebaker and Tour Road Manager Bob Neuwirth, an alternative version of the video for "Subterranean Homesick Blues", the original companion book edited by D. A. Pennebaker to coincide with the film's release in 1968, a flip-book for a section of the "Subterranean Homesick Blues" video, and a brand new documentary by D. A. Pennebaker and edited by Walker Lamond called 65 Revisited. The DVD packaging was also given new artwork.

On November 24, 2015, The Criterion Collection released a newly restored 4K transfer of the film on Blu-ray and DVD. The Criterion version contained new special features.

== See also ==
- List of American films of 1967
- Festival – Oscar-nominated concert documentary from the same year also featuring Dylan

== Literature ==
- Hall, Jeanne (1998): Don´t you ever just watch? American Cinéma vérité and DONT LOOK BACK. In: Grant, Barry Keith/Sloniowski, Jeannette (eds.): Documenting the Documentary. Close Readings of Documentary Film and Video. pp. 223–236, Detroit: Wayne St. University Press, ISBN 978-0814326398
- Saunders, Dave (2007). Direct Cinema: Observational Documentary and the Politics of the Sixties. London: Wallflower Press. ISBN 978-1-905674-16-9. (This book contains a lengthy chapter on Dont Look Back and its cultural context and significance.)
