= Gary Barwin =

Canadian writer (born 1964)

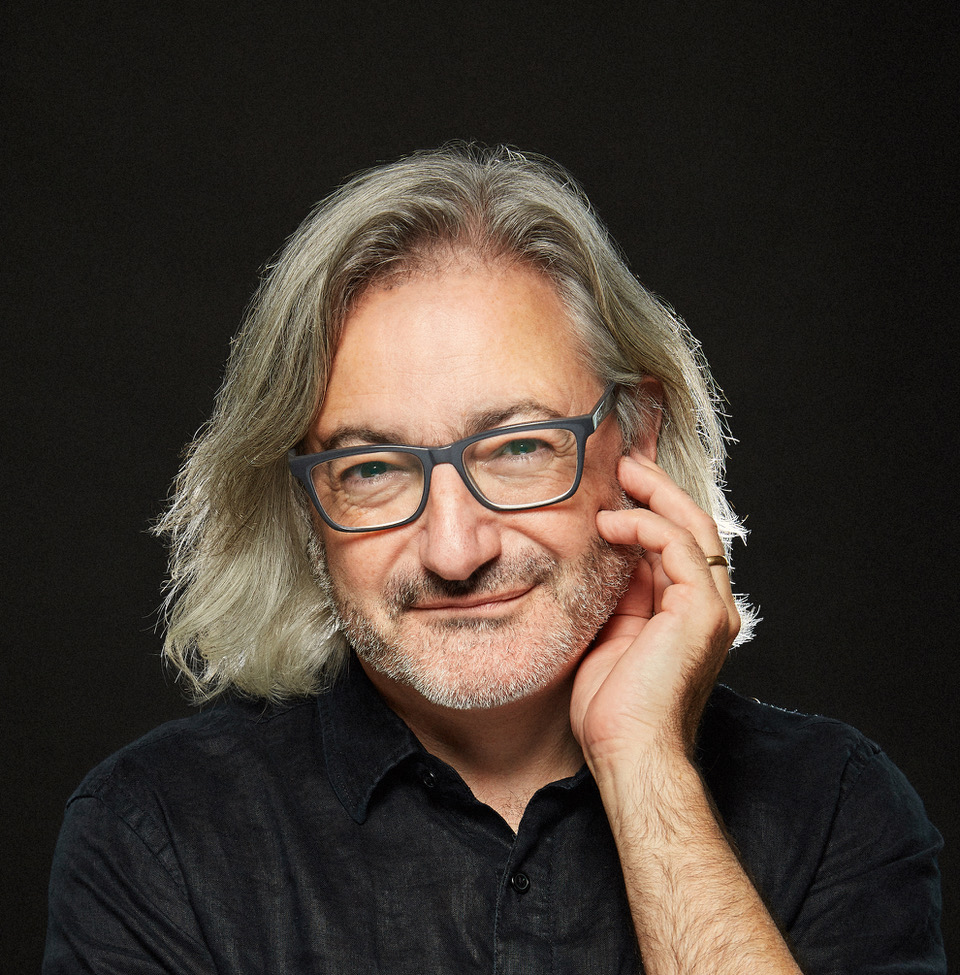
Gary Barwin

Gary Barwin (born 1964 in Belfast, Northern Ireland) is a Canadian poet, writer, composer, multimedia artist, performer and educator who lives in Hamilton, Ontario, Canada. He writes in a range of genres including poetry, fiction, visual poetry, music for live performers and computers, text and sound works, and writing for children and young adults. His music and writing have been presented in Canada, the US, Japan, and Europe.

Barwin was born in Belfast, Northern Ireland, and emigrated to Ottawa, Ontario, in the early 1970s. He graduated from York University with a BFA in music and a BA in creative writing in 1985, where he studied writing with bpNichol, Frank Davey and music with David Mott, James Tenney, and Trichy Sankaran. Barwin received a PhD in music composition from SUNY at Buffalo in 1995. Barwin taught music at Hillfield Strathallan College from 2001 to 2010. He also has taught creative writing at King's University College (Western University), in the Certificate in Writing Program at McMaster University, and at Mohawk College, and at the Art Forms (Urban Arts Initiative) for street-involved youth. In addition to books, he is the author of chapbooks and pamphlets, many from his own serif of nottingham editions. His work has appeared in anthologies. He was the Fall 2013 eWriter in Residence at the Toronto Public Library, the 2014–2015 Writer-in-Residence at Western University and the London Public Library, and the writer-in-residence at Hillfield Strathallan College in 2016–2017, the 2017–2018 Writer-in-Residence at McMaster University and the Hamilton Public Library, and was 2019 Edna Staebler Writer-in-Residence at Wilfrid Laurier University. He has also been writer-in-residence at University of Toronto (Scarborough), and Sheridan College,

He lives in Hamilton, Ontario where he directs the Niagara Regional Rhyme Gland Laboratory for the National Rhyme Institute.

== Awards ==
Barwin was the winner of the 2013 City of Hamilton Arts Award (Writing) and the Hamilton Poetry Book of the Year (2001 and 2011), and co-winner of the 2011 Harbourfront Poetry NOW competition. He has received major grants from the Canada Council and the Ontario Arts Council. He was the recipient of the 1998 Artist Award from the KM Hunter Foundation. Seeing Stars, a YA novel, was a 2001 finalist for the CLA YA book of the year, and was nominated for an Arthur Ellis Award. In 2009, Barwin won a bpNichol Chapbook Award for his book Inverting the Deer.

Barwin's novel Yiddish for Pirates won the 2017 Stephen Leacock Medal for Humour, the Canadian Jewish Literary Award (Fiction), and was shortlisted for the Scotiabank Giller Prize and the Governor General's Award for English-language fiction.

== Books ==
- 1995: Cruelty to Fabulous Animals, poetry/fiction. Moonstone Press
- 1995: The Mud Game, novel, collaboration with Stuart Ross. Mercury Press
- 1998: Big Red Baby, short fiction. The Mercury Press
- 1998: Outside the Hat, poetry. Coach House Books
- 2001: Raising Eyebrows, poetry. Coach House Books
- 2004: Doctor Weep and Other Strange Teeth, fiction. The Mercury Press
- 2005: Frogments from the Frag Pool, poetry, collaboration with Derek Beaulieu). Mercury Press
- 2010: The Porcupinity of the Stars, poetry. Coach House Books.
- 2011: The Obvious Flap, poetry, collaboration with Gregory Betts, BookThug
- 2011: Franzlations: the Imaginary Kafka Parables, (poetry, collaboration with Craig Conley and Hugh Thomas). New Star.
- 2014: Moon Baboon Canoe, poetry. Mansfield Press.
- 2015: The Wild and Unfathomable Always, visual poetry. Xexoxial Editions*
- 2015: I, Dr. Greenblatt, Orthodontist, 251-1457, fiction. Anvil Press
- 2015: Sonosyntactics: Selected and New Poetry of Paul Dutton, poetry. Edited and introduced by Barwin. Wilfrid Laurier University Press.
- 2016: Yiddish for Pirates, novel. Random House Canada
- 2017: No TV for Woodpeckers, poetry. Buckrider Books, Wolsak and Wynn Press.
- 2019: A Cemetery for Holes, poetry with Tom Prime. Gordon Hill Press.
- 2019: For It Is a Pleasure and a Surprise to Breathe: New and Selected Poems. Alessandro Porco, ed., Wolsak and Wynn.
- 2020: Me Then You Then Me (poetry with Kathryn Mockler.) Knife Fork Books.
- 2021: Nothing the Same, Everything Haunted: The Ballad of Motl the Cowboy. Random House Canada.
- 2022: The Fabulous Op. (poetry, collaboration with Gregory Betts). Beir Bua.
- 2022: The Most Charming Creatures.' (poetry) ECW Press.
- 2022: Bird Arsonist. (poetry with Tom Prime.) New Star.
- 2023: Bird Eats Yeast, Quacks, Explodes; Man Loses Eye' (poetry with Lillian Nećakov.) Guernica Editions.
- 2023: Imagining Imagining: Essays on Language, Identity and Infinity. Wolsak and Wynn.
- 2024: Scandal at the Alphorn Factory: New & Selected Short Fiction, 2024-1984. Assembly Press.

=== For children ===
- 1998: The Racing Worm Brothers, children's fiction. Annick Press
- 1999: The Magic Mustache, children's fiction. Annick Press
- 2000: Grandpa's Snowman, children's fiction. Annick Press
- 2001: Seeing Stars, young adult novel. Stoddart Press
- 2002: La Moustache Magique, French translation of The Magic Mustache, fiction.

=== As editor ===
- 1995: Sonosyntactics: Selected and New Poetry of Paul Dutton, edited & with an introduction, Wilfrid Laurier University Press

== Recordings ==
- These Are The Clams I'm Breathing, (audiocassette), sound poetry, collaboration with Stuart Ross
- 1992: Recurring Irritations: Document One (Taproot 33) Burning Press
- 1994: Martin's Idea, spoken word / music, work for reciter, Musicworks CD #60
- 2021: Blind Willie Johnson's Consonants and the Tree Frogs of Jamaica, compositions. Bandcamp.
- 2021: This is Not a Sad Song, with Gregory Betts and bill bissett, spoken word / music, Bandcamp
- 2024: Burnt Scissors, spoken word / music, Bandcamp

== See also ==
- Canadian literature
- Canadian poetry
- List of Canadian poets
- List of Canadian Jews
