= Leigh Mercer =

British recreational mathematician (1893–1977)

Leigh Mercer (1893–1977) was a British writer of wordplay and recreational mathematics who is best known for devising the palindrome "A man, a plan, a canal: Panama!".

Word Ways called him "a luxuriant source of verbal exotica and linguistic curiosa." Among his palindromes are "Sums are not set as a test on Erasmus."

== Career ==
Leigh Mercer was born in October 1893, the brother of journalist and historian Tom Mercer. His father was a parson in Church of England who enjoyed wordplay like palindromes and spoonerisms, and Mercer says he grew up knowing Lewis Carroll "almost by heart". Mercer regarded himself as "fool of the family, a professional ne'er-do-well" and rarely held jobs for very long, working as many as 60 to 85 different jobs between 1910 and his retirement in 1959. His first and longest job was at Rolls-Royce in Derby, and as many as 30 other jobs, particularly in his early career, were in engineering shops of car companies despite Mercer never learning to drive. When he became bored with engineering, his jobs included clerk of the Post Office Savings Bank, temporary Crawley postman on Christmas Day, handyman at a circus, owner of a yo-yo store, and various others. In 1946, he published an account in the New Statesman of being a "pavement artist" making coins from passersby for his chalk art, and the article earned further coverage including a five-minute appearance on BBC.

Leigh Mercer obfuscated details about himself, using pseudonyms such as the palindromic "Roger G. M'Gregor" when he registered to join the National Puzzlers' League. In a 1991 profile of Mercer in Word Ways, A. Ross Eckler Jr. wrote that Mercer had stressed he was not merely a "'drome man" and had "a number of hobbies".

The London Times called him "a king-pin of this game called palindromes, and whenever you pick up an American book on the subject you are likely to see his name indexed."

In the 1940s, Mercer collected thousands of index cards that has been left in the trash by his employer, Rawlplug, and used them to copy the centers of potential palindromes. In 1946, he came up with "Plan a canal p" which he admitted was "not very hopeful looking" though it became "A man, a plan, a canal: Panama!".

Mercer made many palindrome submissions to Notes and Queries but did not always claim authorship even when he had indeed penned the palindromes.

=== Mathematical limerick ===
The following mathematical limerick is attributed to him:

$$\frac{12 + 144 + 20 + 3\cdot \sqrt{4}}{7} + (5 \times 11) = 9^2+0$$

This is read as follows:

A dozen, a gross, and a score
Plus three times the square root of four
Divided by seven
Plus five times eleven
Is nine squared and not a bit more.
