= Alternade =

An alternade is a word in which its letters, taken alternatively in a strict sequence, and used in the same order as the original word, make up at least two other words. All letters must be used, but the smaller words are not necessarily of the same length. For example, a word with seven letters where every second letter is used will produce a four-letter word and a three-letter word.

In the majority of alternades, every second letter is used to make two smaller words, but in some cases, every third letter is used to make three smaller words. Theoretically, a very long word could use every fourth letter to make four smaller words; e.g., «partitioned» is an alternade for «pin», «ate», «rid», and «to».

The term binade is also used.

The alternade was introduced by L'Allegro in the May 1917 Eastern Enigma, published in June 1917.

Variants on the alternade include the rebade (a hybrid of a rebus and an alternade), and the subade.

At least 4,800 alternades are known to exist.

== Examples ==
=== Every second letter ===
- ALGERIA: makes AGRA and LEI.
- ALTERNADE itself makes: ATRAE and LEND
- ALTERNATION: makes A-TRAIN and LENTO
- BOARD: makes BAD and OR.
- CALLIOPE: makes CLIP and ALOE.
- CARPETWEED(S): makes CREWE(S) and APTED.
- CURTAINLESS: makes CRANES and UTILS.
- PAINED: makes PIE and AND.
- SCHOOLED: makes SHOE and COLD.
- SPALLATION(S): makes SALTO(S) and PLAIN.
- TRIENNIALLY: makes TINILY and RENAL. (This was discovered by Dorse in 1949. It has been claimed that triennially is the longest alternade, but other 11-letter examples exist where the resultant words are obscure.)
- TROUPE(S): makes TOP(S) and RUE.
- TRUANCIES: makes TUNIS and RACE.
- WAIST: makes WIT and AS.
- WAISTS: makes WIT and ASS.

=== Every third letter ===
- LACERATED: the 1st, 4th and 7th letters make LET; the 2nd, 5th and 8th letters make ARE; and the 3rd, 6th and 9th letters make CAD.
- ABOMINATE: the 1st, 4th, and 7th letters make AMA, the 2nd, 5th, and 8th letters make BIT, and the 3rd, 6th, and 9th letters make ONE.
- SIMILARLY: the 1st, 4th, and 7th letters make SIR, the 2nd, 5th, and 8th letters make ILL, and the 3rd, 6th, and 9th letters make MAY.
- MANIPULATORS: the 1st, 4th, 7th and 10th letters make MILO, the 2nd, 5th, 8th and 11th letters make APAR, and the 3rd, 6th, 9th and 12th letters make NUTS.

== Sources ==
- Words Built From Smaller Words
- Woodge.com.lexicon
