= Derek Beaulieu =

Canadian writer

- Born: December 7, 1973 (age 52); Montreal, Quebec
- Education: University of Calgary, University of Roehampton
- Occupations: Poet, publisher and anthologist

Derek Alexander Beaulieu (born December 7, 1973, in Montreal, Quebec) is a Canadian poet, publisher and anthologist.

Beaulieu studied contemporary Canadian poetics at the University of Calgary and Creative Writing at Roehampton University. His work has appeared internationally in small press publications, magazines, and in visual art galleries. He has lectured on small press politics, arts funding and literary community in Canada, the United States, the United Kingdom and Iceland. He was the 2014-2016 Poet Laureate of Calgary, Alberta, Canada and the 2022-2024 Poet Laureate of Banff, Alberta, Canada.

He works extensively around issues of community and poetics, and along those lines has edited (or co-edited) the magazines filling Station (1998–2001, 2004–2008), dANDelion (2001–2004), endNote (2000–2001) and The Minute Review (2010, 2021–present).

He founded housepress in 1997 from which he published small editions of poetry, prose and critical work until 2004. The housepress fonds are now located at Simon Fraser University. In 2005 he founded the small press no press.

In 2005 he co-edited Shift & Switch: new Canadian poetry with Angela Rawlings and Jason Christie, a controversial anthology of new poetry which has been reviewed internationally. In 2016 he co-edited The Calgary Renaissance with Rob McLennan.

Beaulieu has shifted his focus in recent years to conceptual fiction, specifically visual translations/rewritings. His book Flatland consists of visual patterns based on the typography of Edwin Abbott Abbott's classic novel Flatland and his book Local Colour is a series of colour blocks based on the original text of Paul Auster's novella Ghosts.

How to Write, a collection of conceptual prose, was published by Talonbooks in 2010.

Beaulieu lives in Banff, Alberta where he is Director, Literary Arts at Banff Centre for Arts and Creativity.

== Selected bibliography ==
- 2003:With Wax. Toronto: Coach House ISBN 1-55245-118-6
- 2005:Frogments from the Fragpool: Haiku after Basho Toronto: Mercury ISBN 1-55128-112-0 (with Gary Barwin)
- 2005:Shift & Switch: New Canadian Poetry. Toronto: Mercury ISBN 1-55128-116-3 (edited with angela rawlings and Jason Christie).
- 2006:fractal economies. Vancouver: Talonbooks ISBN 0-88922-539-7
- 2007:Flatland. York: information as material ISBN 978-0-9553092-5-0
- 2008:Local Colour. Helsinki: ntamo ISBN 978-952-215-049-3
- 2008:chains. Kingston, PA: paper kite press
- 2010:How to Write. Vancouver: Talonbooks ISBN 978-0-88922-629-6.
- 2010:Silence. Anchill Island: redfoxpress
- 2011:seen of the crime: essays on conceptual writing. Montreal: Snare
- 2012:Kern Lafarge, WI: Xexoxial Editions
- 2013:Writing Surfaces: Selected Fiction of John Riddell Waterloo, ON: Wilfrid Laurier University Press (edited with Lori Emerson)
- 2013:Please, No More Poetry: the Poetry of derek beaulieu Waterloo, ON: Wilfrid Laurier University Press (edited by Kit Dobson)
- 2014:Kern. Los Angeles, CA: Les Figues
- 2015: The Unbearable Contact with Poets. Manchester, UK: if p then q
- 2016: Ascender / Descender. Anchill Island: redfoxpress
- 2016:The Calgary Renaissance. Ottawa: Chaudiere Books (edited with Rob Mclennan).
- 2017: Konzeptuelle Arbeiten. Bern, Switzerland: edition taberna kritika
- 2017: a, A Novel. Paris, France: Jean Boite Editions
- 2018: Counter / Weight. Anchill Island: redfoxpress
- 2018: Nights on Prose Mountain: the Fiction of bpNichol. Toronto: Coach House.
- 2019: Aperture. Shropshire: Penteract.
- 2021: Lens Flare. Falmouth: Guillemot. (with Rhys Farrell)
- 2022: Surface Tension. Toronto: Coach House.
- 2023: Silence: Essays and Lectures. Malmo, Sweden: Timglaset.
- 2024: Some Lines of Poetry from the Notebooks of bpNichol. Toronto: Coach House. (edited with Gregory Betts)
- 2026: Do It Wrong: How to be a Poet in the Twenty-First Century. Prince Edward County: Assembly Press. ISBN 9781998336296

== English Teacher ==
In addition to writing, Beaulieu has also taught with the Calgary Board of Education, the Alberta University of the Arts, the University of Calgary, and Mount Royal University.

== See also ==
- Canadian literature
- Canadian poetry
- Conceptual art
- Concrete poetry
- List of Canadian poets
- Sound poetry
