= 1981 in literature =

This article contains information about the literary events and publications of 1981.

== Events ==
- May 31 – The burning of Jaffna Public Library in Sri Lanka is begun by a mob of police and government-sponsored paramilitaries. They destroy over 97,000 volumes in one of the worst examples of ethnic book burning in the modern era.
- August – Sefer ve Sefel opens as an English used bookstore in Jerusalem.
- unknown dates
  - John Gardner successfully revives the James Bond novel series originated by Ian Fleming with Licence Renewed (not counting a faux biography of Bond and a pair of film novelizations, the first original Bond novel since 1968's Colonel Sun). The revived Bond book series will run uninterrupted until 2002.
  - Colin MacCabe is denied tenure at the University of Cambridge, apparently because of a dispute within the English Faculty about the teaching of structuralism.
  - The PEN/Faulkner Award for Fiction is given for the first time.

== New books ==
=== Fiction ===
- Eric Ambler – The Care of Time
- Kingsley Amis (ed.) – The Golden Age of Science Fiction
- Martin Amis – Other People
- V. C. Andrews – If There Be Thorns
- Louis Auchincloss – The Cat and the King
- René Barjavel – Une rose au paradis
- Samuel Beckett – Ill Seen Ill Said
- Thomas Berger – Reinhart's Women
- Pierre Berton – Flames Across the Border
- William Boyd – A Good Man in Africa
- Pascal Bruckner – Evil Angels
- William S. Burroughs – Cities of the Red Night
- Robert Olen Butler – The Alleys of Eden
- Peter Carey – Bliss
- Raymond Carver – What We Talk About When We Talk About Love
- David Case – The Third Grave
- James Clavell – Noble House
- Bernard Cornwell
  - Sharpe's Eagle
  - Sharpe's Gold
- John Crowley – Little, Big
- L. Sprague de Camp – The Hand of Zei
- L. Sprague de Camp and Catherine Crook de Camp – Footprints on Sand
- Régine Deforges – La Bicyclette bleue (The Blue Bicycle)
- Samuel R. Delany – Distant Star
- Michel Déon – Where Are You Dying Tonight? (Un déjeuner de soleil)
- Cynthia Freeman – No Time for Tears
- Gabriel García Márquez – Chronicle of a Death Foretold (Crónica de una muerte anunciada)
- John Gardner – Licence Renewed
- Charles L. Grant – Tales from the Nightside
- Alasdair Gray – Lanark
- Jan Guillou – Ondskan
- Thomas Harris – Red Dragon
- Frank Herbert – God Emperor of Dune
- Douglas Hill – Planet of the Warlord
- Robert E. Howard and L. Sprague de Camp – The Flame Knife
- John Irving – The Hotel New Hampshire
- Rona Jaffe – Mazes and Monsters
- Alan Judd – A Breed of Heroes
- Ismail Kadare – The File on H (Dosja J)
- Stephen King – Cujo
- Dean Koontz (as Leigh Nichols) – The Eyes of Darkness
- Chart Korbjitti – Khamphiphaksa (The Judgment)
- Joe R. Lansdale – Act of Love
- Stanisław Lem – Golem XIV
- Colleen McCullough – An Indecent Obsession
- Elliot S! Maggin – Miracle Monday
- Naguib Mahfouz – Arabian Nights and Days (ليالي ألف ليلة)
- Ian McEwan – The Comfort of Strangers
- Toni Morrison – Tar Baby
- Robert B. Parker
  - A Savage Place
  - Early Autumn
- Ellis Peters
  - Saint Peter's Fair
  - The Leper of Saint Giles
- Terry Pratchett – Strata
- Bano Qudsia – Raja Gidh ("King Vulture")
- Alain Robbe-Grillet – Djinn
- Harold Robbins – Goodbye, Janette
- Salman Rushdie – Midnight's Children
- Lawrence Sanders – The Third Deadly Sin
- Martin Cruz Smith – Gorky Park
- Muriel Spark – Loitering with Intent
- Botho Strauß – Couples, Passersby (Paare, Passanten) (stories)
- Paul Theroux – The Mosquito Coast
- D. M. Thomas – The White Hotel
- John Updike – Rabbit Is Rich
- Jack Vance – The Book of Dreams
- Gore Vidal – Creation
- Joseph Wambaugh – The Glitter Dome
- Kit Williams – Masquerade
- Gene Wolfe
  - The Claw of the Conciliator
  - The Sword of the Lictor
- Roger Zelazny
  - The Changing Land
  - Madwand

=== Children and young people ===
- Chris Van Allsburg – Jumanji
- Hans Christian Andersen (with Jane S. Woodward and Michael Hague) – Michael Hague's Favourite Hans Christian Andersen Fairy Tales
- Judy Blume – Tiger Eyes
- Beverly Cleary – Ramona Quimby, Age 8
- Eth Clifford – The Dastardly Murder of Dirty Pete
- Roald Dahl – George's Marvellous Medicine
- Rumer Godden – The Dragon of Og'
- Roger Hargreaves – Little Miss (first 13 books in the Little Miss series of 21)
- Florence Parry Heide – Treehorn's Treasure
- Gordon Korman – I Want to Go Home!
- Harold Lamb (with George Barr and Alicia Austin) – Durandal
- Michael de Larrabeiti – The Borribles Go for Broke
- Janet Lunn – The Root Cellar
- Patricia Lynch – The Turf-Cutter's Donkey
- Michelle Magorian – Goodnight Mister Tom
- C. L. Moore (with Alicia Austin) - Scarlet Dream
- Uri Orlev – The Island on Bird Street (האי ברחוב הציפורים)
- Ruth Park – The Muddle-Headed Wombat is Very Bad
- Bill Peet – Encore for Eleanor
- Alvin Schwartz – Scary Stories to Tell in the Dark
- Maurice Sendak – Outside Over There
- Jan Wahl – The Cucumber Princess
- Robert Westall – The Scarecrows

=== Drama ===
- Samuel Beckett – Rockaby
- Edward Bond – Restoration
- Tankred Dorst – Merlin oder das wüste Land
- Dario Fo – Trumpets and Raspberries (Clacson, trombette e pernacchi)
- John Krizanc – Tamara
- Larry Shue – The Nerd
- Barney Simon – Woza Albert!
- Botho Strauß – Kalldewey, Farce
- Patrick Süskind – Der Kontrabaß
- Peter Whelan – The Accrington Pals
- Tennessee Williams – The Notebook of Trigorin

=== Poetry ===
- L. Sprague de Camp – Heroes and Hobgoblins
- Mehr Lal Soni Zia Fatehabadi – Rang-o-Noor (The Colour and the Light)
- Norman Nicholson – Sea to the West
- Sylvia Plath (posthumous) – Collected Poems, edited by Ted Hughes
- Kathleen Raine – Collected Poems, 1935–1980
- Richard L. Tierney – Collected Poems

=== Non-fiction ===
- Maya Angelou – The Heart of a Woman
- Colin Robert Chase – The Dating of Beowulf
- Mary Chesnut – Mary Chesnut's Civil War
- Hugo Brandt Corstius – Opperlandse taal- & letterkunde
- Angela Davis – Women, Race and Class'
- Daniel Dennett – Brainstorms: Philosophical Essays on Mind and Psychology
- Nancy Dorian – Language Death: The Life Cycle of a Scottish Gaelic Dialect
- Timothy Findley – Famous Last Words
- Stephen Jay Gould – The Mismeasure of Man
- bell hooks – Ain't I a Woman? Black Women and Feminism
- Dumas Malone – The Sage of Monticello
- V. S. Naipaul – Among the Believers: An Islamic Journey
- Giovanni Pettinato – The Archives of Ebla: An Empire Inscribed in Clay
- Anne Scott-James – The Cottage Garden
- Viktor Suvorov – The Liberators

== Births ==
- Jan 4 – Sarah Crossan, Irish young-adult writer
- April 7 – Lili Wilkinson, Australian young-adult writer
- April 13 – Rebecca Yarros, American fantasy author
- May 19 – Kiera Cass, American young-adult writer
- May 20 – Ottessa Moshfegh, American novelist
- June 10 – Juno Dawson, born James Dawson, English young-adult LGBT writer
- July 10 – Karen Russell, American novelist
- July 27 – Dan Jones, British historian and TV presenter
- September 30 – Cecelia Ahern, Irish novelist
- October 3 – Leïla Slimani, Franco-Moroccan novelist
- October 12 – NoViolet Bulawayo (Elizabeth Zandile Tshele), Zimbabwe-born novelist
- October 31 – Irina Denezhkina, Russian writer
- December 11 – Hamish Blake, Australian comedian, actor and author
- December 13 – Mathis Bailey, American-Canadian novelist and fiction writer
- unknown dates
  - Amy Sackville, English novelist
  - Sunjeev Sahota, English novelist
  - Saud Alsanousi, Kuwaiti novelist
  - Olesya Mamchich, Ukrainian poet and children's writer

== Deaths ==
- January 5 – Lanza del Vasto, Italian-born philosopher, poet and activist (born 1901)
- January 6 – A. J. Cronin, Scottish novelist (born 1896)
- January 7 – John Pascal, American playwright, screenwriter, author and journalist (born 1932)
- January 23 – Lobsang Rampa (Cyril Henry Hoskin), English author (born 1910)
- February 3 – Normand Poirier, American newspaper editor, journalist and essayist (born 1928)
- February 17 – David Garnett, English novelist (born 1892)
- February 23 – Nan Shepherd, Scottish novelist and poet (born 1893)
- March 7 – Bosley Crowther, American film critic (born 1905)
- March 14 – Eleanor Perry, American screenwriter and author (born 1914)
- March 20 – Pedro García Cabrera, Spanish poet (born 1905)
- March 29 – Clive Sansom, English-born Tasmanian poet and playwright (born 1910)
- March 31 – Enid Bagnold, English writer and playwright (born 1889)
- April 1 – D. F. Jones, English science fiction writer (born 1918)
- April 13 – Gwyn Thomas, Welsh novelist and broadcaster (born 1913)
- April 23 – Josep Pla, Catalan Spanish journalist and writer (born 1897)
- April 26 – Robert Garioch, Scottish poet (born 1909)
- May 8 – Uri Zvi Grinberg, Israeli poet writing in Hebrew and Yiddish (born 1896)
- May 9 – Nelson Algren, American novelist (born 1909)
- May 18 – William Saroyan, American novelist and dramatist (born 1908)
- May 23 – Rayner Heppenstall, English writer and poet (born 1911)
- May 30 – Gwendolyn B. Bennett, African-American writer and artist (born 1902)
- June 15 – Philip Toynbee, English novelist and journalist (born 1916)
- June 17 – Zerna Sharp, American writer and educator (born 1889)
- June 18 – Pamela Hansford Johnson, English poet, novelist, playwright, literary and social critic (born 1912)
- August 15 – Carol Ryrie Brink, American author (born 1895)
- September 3 – Alec Waugh, English novelist (born 1898)
- September 7 – Christy Brown, Irish writer and painter (born 1932)
- September 12 – Eugenio Montale, Italian poet (born 1896)
- October 20 – Mary Coyle Chase, American playwright (born 1906)
- October 25 – Cynthia Harnett, English children's writer (born 1893)
- October 30 – Denys Rhodes, English novelist (born 1919)
- November 6 – Digby George Gerahty, English novelist (born 1898)
- November 30 – Charles Eric Maine, English science fiction writer (born 1921)
- December 9 – C. P. Taylor, Scottish playwright (born 1929)
- December 26 – Amber Reeves, New Zealand-born English scholar, feminist and novelist (born 1887)

== Awards ==
- Nobel Prize for Literature: Elias Canetti

=== Australia ===
- The Australian/Vogel Literary Award: Chris Matthews, Al Jazzar; Tim Winton, An Open Swimmer
- Kenneth Slessor Prize for Poetry: Alan Gould, Astral Sea
- Miles Franklin Award: Peter Carey, Bliss

=== Canada ===
- See 1981 Governor General's Awards for a complete list of winners and finalists for those awards.

=== France ===
- Prix Goncourt: Lucien Bodard, Anne Marie
- Prix Médicis French: François-Olivier Rousseau, L'Enfant d'Édouard
- Prix Médicis International: David Shahar, Le Jour de la comtesse

=== Spain ===
- Miguel de Cervantes Prize: Octavio Paz

=== United Kingdom ===
- Booker Prize: Salman Rushdie, Midnight's Children
- Carnegie Medal for children's literature: Robert Westall, The Scarecrows
- Cholmondeley Award: Roy Fisher, Robert Garioch, Charles Boyle
- Eric Gregory Award: Alan Jenkins, Simon Rae, Marion Lomax, Philip Gross, Kathleen Jamie, Mark Abley, Roger Crowley, Ian Gregson
- James Tait Black Memorial Prize for fiction: Salman Rushdie, Midnight's Children, and Paul Theroux, The Mosquito Coast
- James Tait Black Memorial Prize for biography: Victoria Glendinning, Edith Sitwell: Unicorn Among Lions
- Queen's Gold Medal for Poetry: D. J. Enright
- Whitbread Best Book Award: William Boyd, A Good Man in Africa

=== United States ===
- Agnes Lynch Starrett Poetry Prize: Kathy Calloway, Heart of the Garfish
- American Academy of Arts and Letters Gold Medal for Belles Lettres: Malcolm Cowley
- Dos Passos Prize: Gilbert Sorrentino
- Nebula Award: Gene Wolfe, The Claw of the Conciliator
- Newbery Medal for children's literature: Katherine Paterson, Jacob Have I Loved
- Pulitzer Prize:
  - Drama: Beth Henley, Crimes of the Heart
  - Fiction: John Kennedy Toole – A Confederacy of Dunces
  - Poetry: James Schuyler: The Morning of the Poem
- Hugo Award:
  - Best Novella: Gordon R. Dickson, Lost Dorsai

=== Elsewhere ===
- Friedenspreis des Deutschen Buchhandels: Lev Kopelev
- Hugo Award for Best Novel: Joan D. Vinge, The Snow Queen
- Premio Nadal: Carmen Gómez Ojea, Cantiga de aguero

== Notes ==
- Hahn, Daniel (2015). The Oxford Companion to Children's Literature (Second ed.). New York, NY: Oxford University Press. ISBN 9780198715542.
