= Australian Rosny Children's Choir =

Australian children's choir based in Tasmania

- Choir
- Origin: Rosny, Tasmania, Australia
- Founded: 1967; 59 years ago
- Founder: Jennifer Filby
- Genre: classical; choral music
- President: Ronald Soundy (inaugural)
- Music director: Andrew Bainbridge (formal)
- Associated groups: Tasmanian Symphony Orchestra
- Label: Various

The Australian Rosny Children's Choir is a children's choir based in Rosny, Tasmania, known for its distinctive choral repertoire, contributions to cultural diplomacy, and its role in developing young Tasmanian musicians.

Established in 1967 by the accomplished choral director and piano teacher Jennifer Filby, the choir initially performed locally but quickly gained national and international acclaim. Over three decades under Filby’s leadership, the choir performed widely, collaborated with symphony orchestras, commissioned new Australian works, and undertook international tours that established its reputation as one of Australia’s premier children’s choirs. At its peak in the 1980s, the organisation included approximately 160 children in its training, performance, and touring divisions.

== History ==
Jennifer Vivienne Filby (1938–1997), the choir’s founder, was born in Devonport, Tasmania, and raised in a family deeply involved in music. Her father, William White, was a pianist, cornettist, and dance band leader, while her mother, Reta, was a singer and pianist. Jennifer pursued music from an early age, excelling in piano and music theory and competing at the Devonport Eisteddfod Society’s competitions. After moving to Hobart, she trained in teaching and music at the University of Tasmania, studying piano with the distinguished Ann McGarry and voice production with Lucy Purchas. She attained her licentiate in piano performance from the Australian Music Examinations Board in 1961.

Filby began her career as an infant and primary teacher and soon added singing instruction to her teaching repertoire. She founded the Rosny Children’s Choir in 1967 after a successful carol recital with her students led to requests for performances. The choir’s first major public engagement was providing the children's chorus for a production of The King and I at the Theatre Royal, Hobart, in 1966. The following year, Filby formally established the choir in Rosny, and it soon began to excel in local and national eisteddfods, earning recognition for its discipline and musicality.

In 1971, the choir made its first overseas tour to compete in the prestigious Llangollen International Musical Eisteddfod in Wales, where it became the first choir from the Southern Hemisphere to participate. The choir also performed in major cities across the United Kingdom, including Liverpool, Birmingham, and London, as well as in Singapore on the return journey. Filby’s husband, Ian Filby, served as stage manager and sound technician, and their children were members of the choir, making it a family endeavour.

As the choir gained popularity, it became an incorporated body in 1972, with Hobart's Lord Mayor, Ronald Soundy, as its first president. The choir’s focus extended beyond Tasmania, performing regularly with Australian symphony orchestras, including the Tasmanian Symphony Orchestra (TSO), Sydney Symphony Orchestra, Melbourne Symphony Orchestra, and South Australian Symphony Orchestra. Conductors such as Henry Krips, Patrick Thomas, and Georg Tintner praised the choir’s exceptional discipline and musicality.

In 1975, the choir participated in a historic cultural exchange with the People’s Republic of China, becoming the first Australian musical group to perform on mainland China, with concerts in Beijing, Guangzhou, and Shanghai, as well as stops in British Hong Kong and Manila. This tour marked a significant milestone in Australia-China relations and was seen as a pioneering example of cultural diplomacy.

In 1976, the choir was chosen by the Australian Broadcasting Corporation to represent Australia in the international Let the Peoples Sing competition, organised by the European Broadcasting Union.

The choir later toured internationally to New Zealand in 1984 and Japan in 1987. At its peak in the 1980s, the choir included around 160 children across its training, performing, and touring choirs. In 1995, the Hobart Hebrew Congregation celebrated its 150th anniversary with a series of events, including two concerts held at the historic Hobart Synagogue. As part of these celebrations, the Rosny Children's Choir performed alongside Melbourne cantors Michel Laloum and Judy Firestone in a cantorial concert of Jewish songs.

Despite the demands of her role as choir director, Filby maintained an active piano teaching practice and was a committed member of the City of Hobart Eisteddfod Society. Her contributions to music and community were recognised in 1984 when she was awarded the Medal of the Order of Australia (OAM) and again in 1991 with an Advance Australia Award. Filby died from cancer in 1997, leaving a legacy that included memorial prizes established in her name at the Hobart Eisteddfod and for excellence in theory and musicianship at the Australian Music Examinations Board in Tasmania.

One of the choir's most significant achievements under Filby’s direction was the commissioning of the cantata There is an Island in 1993, composed by Don Kay with a libretto by Clive Sansom. Performed and recorded with the TSO at the ABC Odeon Theatre, the work’s mature and sometimes melancholy themes underscored the choir’s dedication to promoting original Australian compositions. Other distinguished recordings include The Sound of Rosny (1977) and The World is a Beautiful Place (1982).

The choir faced notable challenges in the 2010s due to historical criminal convictions of two former directors. In 2012, Peter Robin Richman, a former musical director, was sentenced to two years in jail after being convicted of maintaining an unlawful relationship with a 15-year-old choir member during the 1980s. In 2016, Ian Filby, a long-time director and husband of the choir’s founder Jennifer Filby, was also convicted of child sexual offences. Additional allegations against Filby surfaced in subsequent reports, significantly impacting the choir's reputation.

== Recordings ==
The Australian Rosny Children's Choir has produced several recordings that showcase their versatility and commitment to choral excellence. Notable recordings include:

External videos
- Two YouTube videos
- Rosny Children's Choir (1971)
- "The Lord's Prayer" music video (1982)

- The Rosny Children's Choir At Westminster Abbey (1971), recorded at Westminster Abbey in July 1971.
- The Sound of Rosny (1977), featuring compositions by Don Kay and libretto by Clive Sansom, including collaborations with the TSO.
- The World is a Beautiful Place (1982), recorded at the ABC Odeon Theatre and Madrigal Sound Studios (Sydney), featuring original compositions by Peter Davies, Don Gurr, and Sydney Carter.
- There is an Island (1993), a dramatic cantata by Don Kay, recorded with the TSO at the ABC Odeon Theatre, also featuring The Song of the Maypole by George Dreyfus.

== Tours and notable performances ==
- 1971: Participated in the International Eisteddfod in Llangollen, Wales, as the first choir from the southern hemisphere to join the event.
- 1975: Chosen by the Australian Government for a cultural exchange program, becoming the first Australian musical group to perform in China.
- 1984: New Zealand international tour
- 1987: Japan international tour
- 2006: Port Arthur Historic Site with soprano Amelia Farrugia for the 10th anniversary memorial service of the Port Arthur Massacre
- 2008: Sydney Opera House with the Australian Girls Choir
