= Rosny =

Rosny is the name of several places:

- Rosny, Tasmania in Australia
- Rosny-sous-Bois commune in the Seine-Saint-Denis département in France
- Rosny-sur-Seine commune in the Yvelines département in France
- Rosny, Nevada in Lander County, Nevada in the United States of America

== See also ==
- J.-H. Rosny
