= Rosny, Tasmania =

Rosny
- Suburb
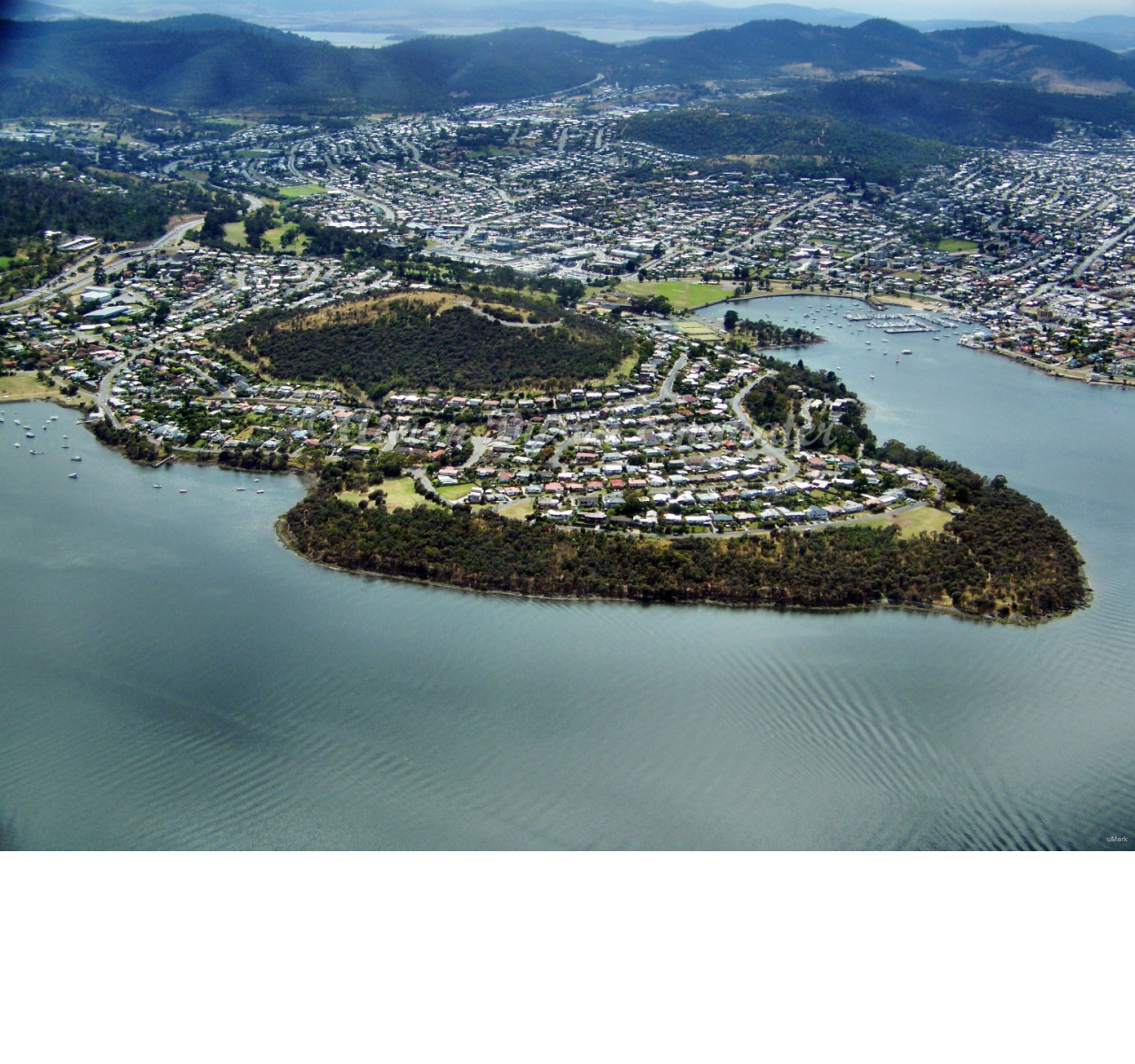
- Aerial image of Rosny and Rosny Hill Nature Recreation Area

- Interactive map of Rosny
- Coordinates: 42°52′24″S 147°21′17″E
- Country: Australia
- State: Tasmania
- City: Hobart
- LGA: City of Clarence
- Location: 6 km (3.7 mi) E of Hobart

Government
  - State electorate: Franklin
  - Federal division: Franklin

Area
  - Total: 0.776 km^{2} (0.300 sq mi)
- Elevation: 46 m (151 ft)

Population
  - Total: 842 (SAL 2021)
- Postcode: 7018
Suburbs around Rosny
(Tasman Bridge)	Montagu Bay	Rosny Park
River Derwent	Rosny	Rosny Park
River Derwent	River Derwent	River Derwent

Rosny is a suburb of the City of Clarence, part of the greater Hobart area, Tasmania, Australia. It is located on the eastern shore of the River Derwent, between the suburbs of Montagu Bay and Rosny Park, approximately 4 kilometres from Hobart's centre. Rosny is the residential part of its commercial namesake Rosny Park.

Rosny is a scenic, quiet residential area, with sweeping views of the River Derwent and its estuary, the Tasman Bridge and Mount Wellington, and looks directly across the river to the CBD of Hobart. It is located on a narrow peninsula which juts out from the eastern shore at Rosny Point and climbs the rising slopes of Rosny Hill.

== History ==
Rosny was named for a family name of W.A. Bethune, the holder of the original grant on the point, and he named it after his ancestor, the Duc de Maximilien de Bethune Sully, of Rosny-sur-Seine near Mantes in France.

=== Rosny Children's Choir ===
Rosny was the founding home of the Australian Rosny Children's Choir. The choir was established in 1967 by local music teacher Jennifer Filby, who initially had her students perform carols at an end-of-year recital. Following this success, she was invited to provide a children's chorus for a production of The King and I at the Theatre Royal in Hobart, leading to the formal creation of the choir.

The choir quickly gained national and international recognition. In 1971, it became the first choir from the Southern Hemisphere to perform at the prestigious Llangollen International Musical Eisteddfod in Wales. As part of the Australian government's inaugural cultural exchange with the People’s Republic of China, the choir made history in 1975 as the first Australian group to perform in China, with concerts in Beijing, Guangzhou, Shanghai, and a stopover in British Hong Kong.

In addition to its international tours to Japan (1987) and across Australia, the choir performed widely within Tasmania. It frequently collaborated with the Tasmanian Symphony Orchestra and commissioned significant Australian works, including There is an Island (1977) by composer Don Kay with libretto by Clive Sansom.

== Today ==
In 2016 Australian Bureau of Statistics Census, the suburb of Rosny had a population of 771 persons and 353 private dwellings.

Much of Rosny is given over to thick groves of local she-oaks, which line the foreshore, interspersed with radiating residential streets. The Rosny Point Reserve, owned by the Clarence City Council covers 7.8 hectares, but does not include the strip of land adjoining the river which is a Public Reserve under the Crown Land Act (6.7 hectares). Rosny Hill Nature Recreation Area (21.4 hectares), under the authority of the Parks and Wildlife Service but managed by the City of Clarence, occupies the hill top. Approximately 46 percent of the total land area of 76.6 hectares of Rosny is reserved land.

Rosny Hill Recreation Area itself is also covered in native vegetation and, although not particularly high at 94.25 metres at the Survey Control Site, its position jutting out into the river provides views from the lookout that skirts the top of the hill.

There are five vegetation communities within the Rosny Hill Nature Recreation Area: Grassy Eucalyptus viminalis woodland, Inland Acacia verticillata low fores, Lowland Themeda grassland, Lowland grassland complex and Bursaria-acacia woodland and scrub. There are several rare and threatened native plant species, including Leafy sun orchid (Thelymitra bracteata), Grassland flax lily (Dianella amoena), Spear grass (Austrostipa nodosa), Tall wallaby grass (Austrodanthonia induta), Shade peppercress (Ledidium pseudotasmanicum), and Narrow leaf New Holland daisy (Vittadinia muelleri).

== Services ==
Housing Tasmania purchased in 2010 the Marantha Nursing Home, now called Bellview Manor, and it is used as Hostel Accommodation providing 32 bedrooms in a Hostel and 8 units.

Rosny's main non-residential infrastructure is the Rosny Waste Water Treatment plant located off Bastick Street owned by Taswater. The plant was once notoriously created foul odours, but modernised techniques have removed this problem. Work commenced in 2004 to install effluent pumps, 6.7 kilometres of raising mains, large storage tank and over 1.8 kilometres of reticulation mains between the plant and the Coal Valley to allow 2.5 billion litres of treated effluent to be used for agricultural use. The works were completed in October 2006.

Located on the boundary between Rosny and Rosny Park area, there is Clarence RSLA and Rosny Park Bowls Club, Rosny Park Tennis Club, Rosny College and the Charles Hand Memorial Park. There are also two churches on the boundary between the Rosny and Montagu Bay suburbs, St James Anglican Church and Seventh Day Adventist Church. The latter church is also used by local Funerals Directors. The Clarence Aquatic Centre YMCA and Clarence Sports Centre are close by in adjoining suburb of Montagu Bay. The local store, also in Montagu Bay suburb has closed down.

== Transport ==
Rosny is serviced by local Metro Tasmania bus route 676 with this service terminating at the Elizabeth Street Bus Mall in Hobart. On weekdays, Route 676 leave Rosny Bus Mall at 7:25 am, 8:12 am, and hourly from 9:31 am until 2:31 pm. Route 676 departs Elizabeth Street Bus Mall in Hobart at 3:24 pm, 4:24 pm and 5:24 pm. There is no weekend or public holiday service. Many residents drive or walk to the bus stop under the Rose Bay High School overpass, near the Clarence Pool, where buses on Metro routes (601, 615, 616, 624, 625, 634, 635, 646) can be hailed. These route operate as a high frequency service, every 10 minutes Monday to Friday, 7 am to 7 pm. These routes are part of 'Turn Up and Go' network introduced 11 January 2016.

There are multi-use paths and cycleways along the shoreline of Rosny Point, linking the suburb with Rosny Park and the CBD of Hobart. There is also a formed track around the top of Rosny Hill.
