= The Third Grave =

1981 novel by David F. Case

- Dust-jacket illustration by Stephen E. Fabian for The Third Grave
- Author: David Case
- Illustrator: Stephen E. Fabian
- Cover artist: Stephen E. Fabian
- Language: English
- Genre: Fantasy novel, Horror novel
- Publisher: Arkham House
- Publication date: 1981
- Publication place: United States
- Media type: Print (Hardback)
- Pages: 184 pp
- ISBN: 0-87054-089-0
- OCLC: 6982669
- Dewey Decimal: 813/.54 19
- LC Class: PS3553.A79 T47

The Third Grave is a fantasy horror novel by author David Case. It was published by Arkham House in 1981 in an edition of 4,158 copies. It was Case's first book published by Arkham House. The novel was reissued in paperback by Valancourt Books in 2019.

== Plot summary ==
While working in Egypt for Sir Harold Gregory, archaeologist Thomas Ashley meets Lucien Mallory and his servant Cooper, who have visited Gregory’s camp after the discovery of a mummy. Later, when Mallory has left the camp, the mummy is discovered vandalised.

Four years later Mallory requests that Ashley visit him In Farriers Bar, a village in Devonshire, to help translate some hieroglyphics from papyrus scrolls discovered in Egypt. Mallory is also in possession of an unusual mummy. Ashley travels to the village where he learns that a brutal murder has recently taken place. Ashley meets a friend in the village and discovers that the friend's daughter has gone to work for Mallory and that Mallory has outraged the local vicar. Mallory’s servant Cooper has also met with an accident and is now severely brain damaged. Ashley visits Mallory’s house and begins the translation for Mallory. Slowly Mallory’s plans are revealed.
