= Federation Concert Hall =

Concert hall and convention venue in Hobart, Tasmania, Australia

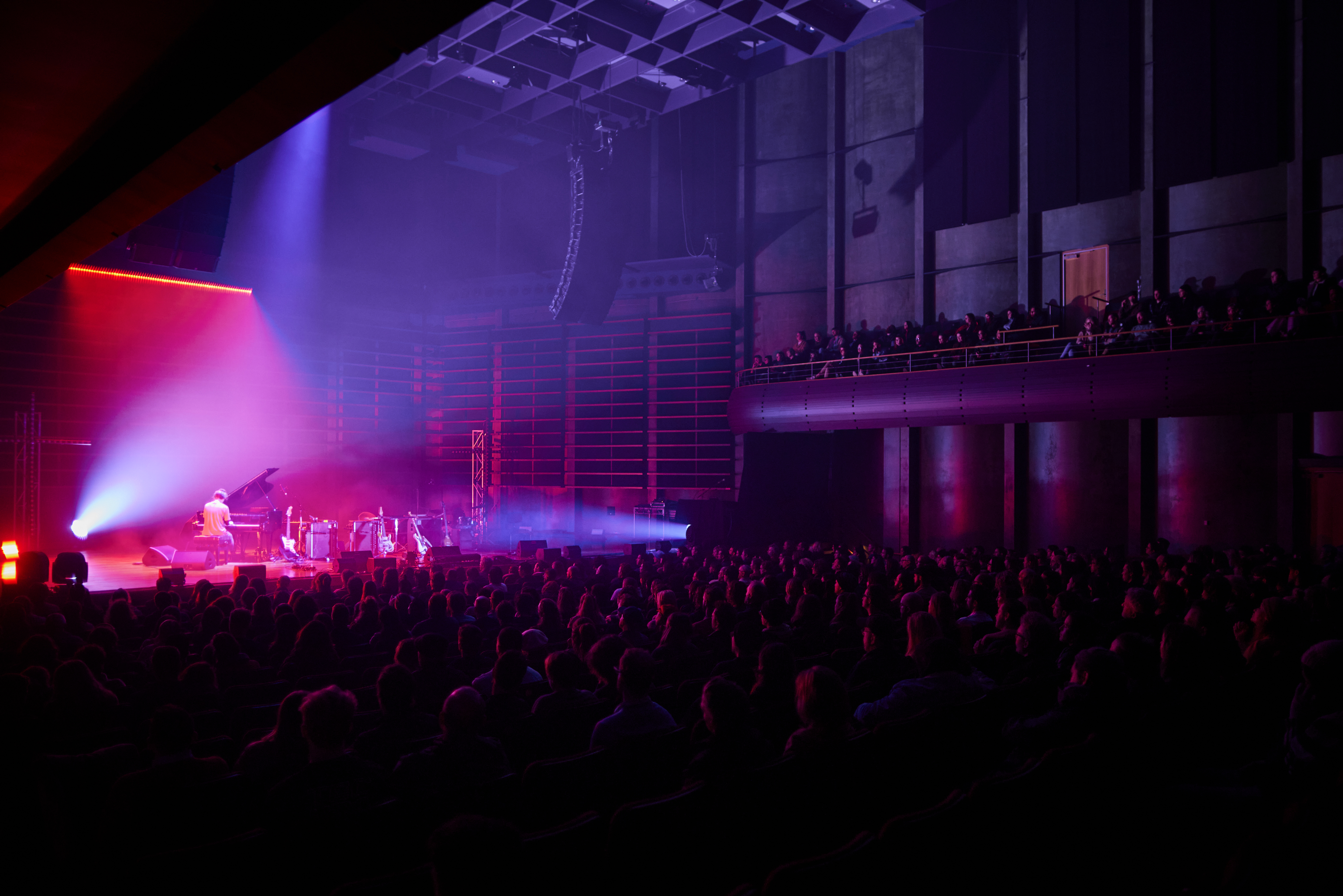
- Monica Brooks, Solstice Eve, Dark Mofo c. 2021
- Interactive map of Federation Concert Hall
- Address: 1 Davey Street, Hobart, Tasmania, Australia
- Location: Sullivans Cove
- Coordinates: 42°52′49.63″S 147°20′3.31″E
- Seating type: Reserved
- Capacity: 1,100
- Type: Concert hall and convention facility
- Events: Classical, contemporary, conferences

Construction
- Built: 1998–2000
- Opened: 7 October 2000
- Architects: Garry Forward (Forward Brianese and Partners)

Tenant
- Tasmanian Symphony Orchestra

Website
- www.tso.com.au/venue-information/

The Federation Concert Hall is a concert and conference venue located on the Sullivans Cove waterfront in Hobart, Tasmania, Australia. Adjoining the Hotel Grand Chancellor, it serves as the principal performance venue for the Tasmanian Symphony Orchestra.

With a seating capacity of 1,100, the hall is Hobart's third-largest indoor venue, after the Tasman Room at Wrest Point and MyState Bank Arena.

== History ==
The need for a new performance venue arose as the Tasmanian Symphony Orchestra's (TSO) long-term home, the ABC Odeon Theatre, had deteriorating and limited facilities after nearly three decades of use. In the late 1990s, a concept for a purpose-built hall was developed as a joint venture, inspired by international examples like Birmingham's Symphony Hall where a concert hall is integrated with a commercial hotel.

The project was funded by a partnership between the Tasmanian and Federal governments, Grand Hotels International (owners of the adjacent Hotel Grand Chancellor), and private investors, at a total cost of approximately A$16,000,000. The Federal Government contributed A$1,000,000 from its Federation Fund, an initiative celebrating the centenary of the Federation of Australia. The venue's name commemorates this contribution.

Constructed on the site of a former Hobart Gas Company gasholder, which influenced its oval exterior design, the hall is structurally integrated with the hotel. It officially opened on 7 October 2000 with a gala concert by the TSO featuring works by Milhaud, Tomasi, and Tchaikovsky.

== Architecture and construction ==
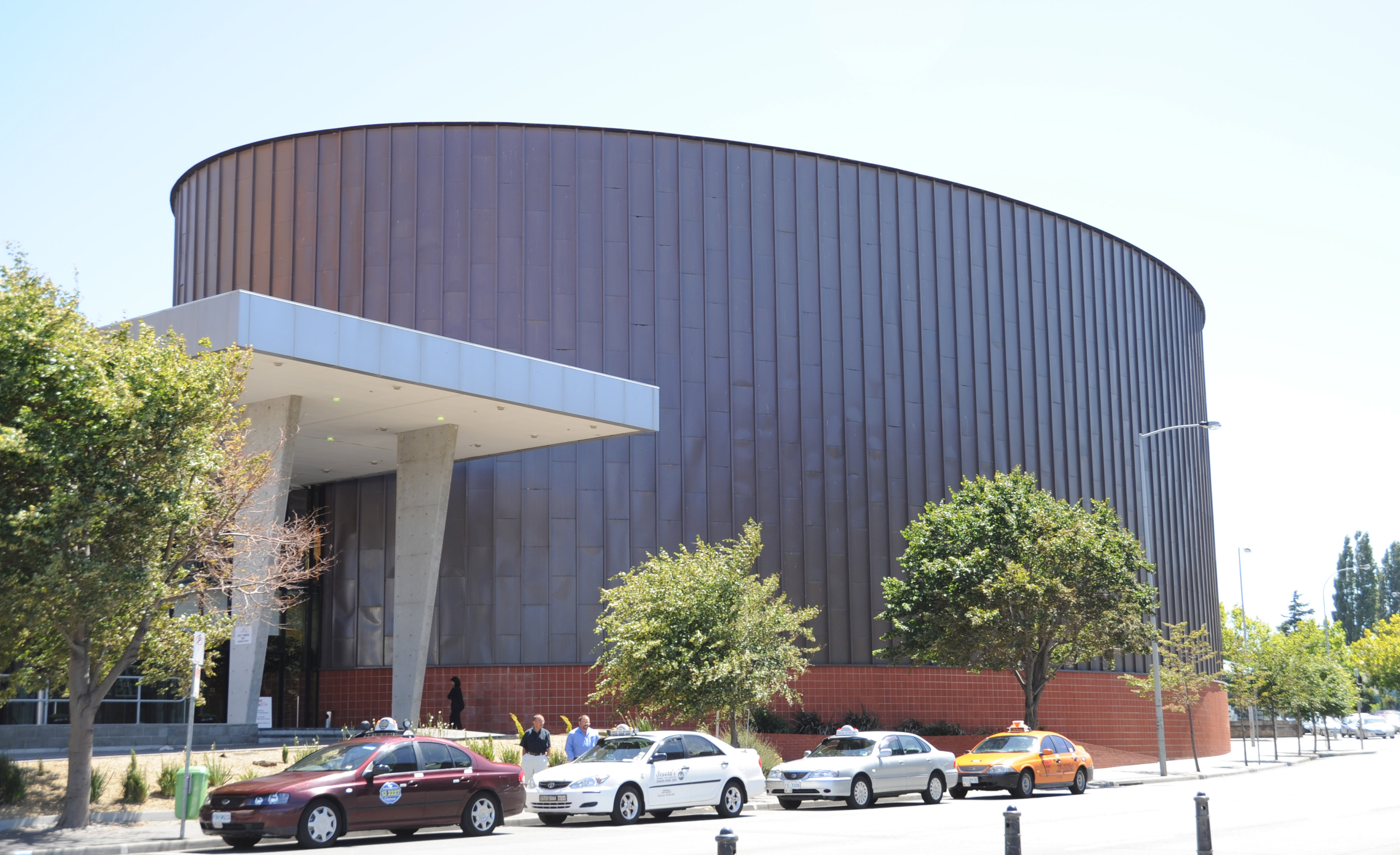
Exterior from Davey Street

The Federation Concert Hall was designed by Forward Brianese and Partners in association with acoustic consultants Arup Acoustics. The external structure comprises a distinctive oval form clad in brass sheeting, intended to weather over time and harmonise with Hobart’s surrounding sandstone architecture.

The interior is formed from a narrower trapezoidal ‘inner skin’ designed for resonance and intimacy, with tall, parallel precast concrete walls and painted finishes. Construction was carried out using over 600 precast concrete elements supplied by Duggans Pty Ltd, including 168 curved panels, 88 columns, and 198 roof infill beams, totalling approximately 1,350 tonnes of material.

The use of precast concrete allowed for sound isolation and structural efficiency, with the walls laterally supported by spliced columns to an 18 m (59 ft) height. The hall's acoustic design incorporated timber flooring, purpose-built reflectors, and diffusive wall surfaces to control resonance and external noise.

== Acoustic design and upgrades ==
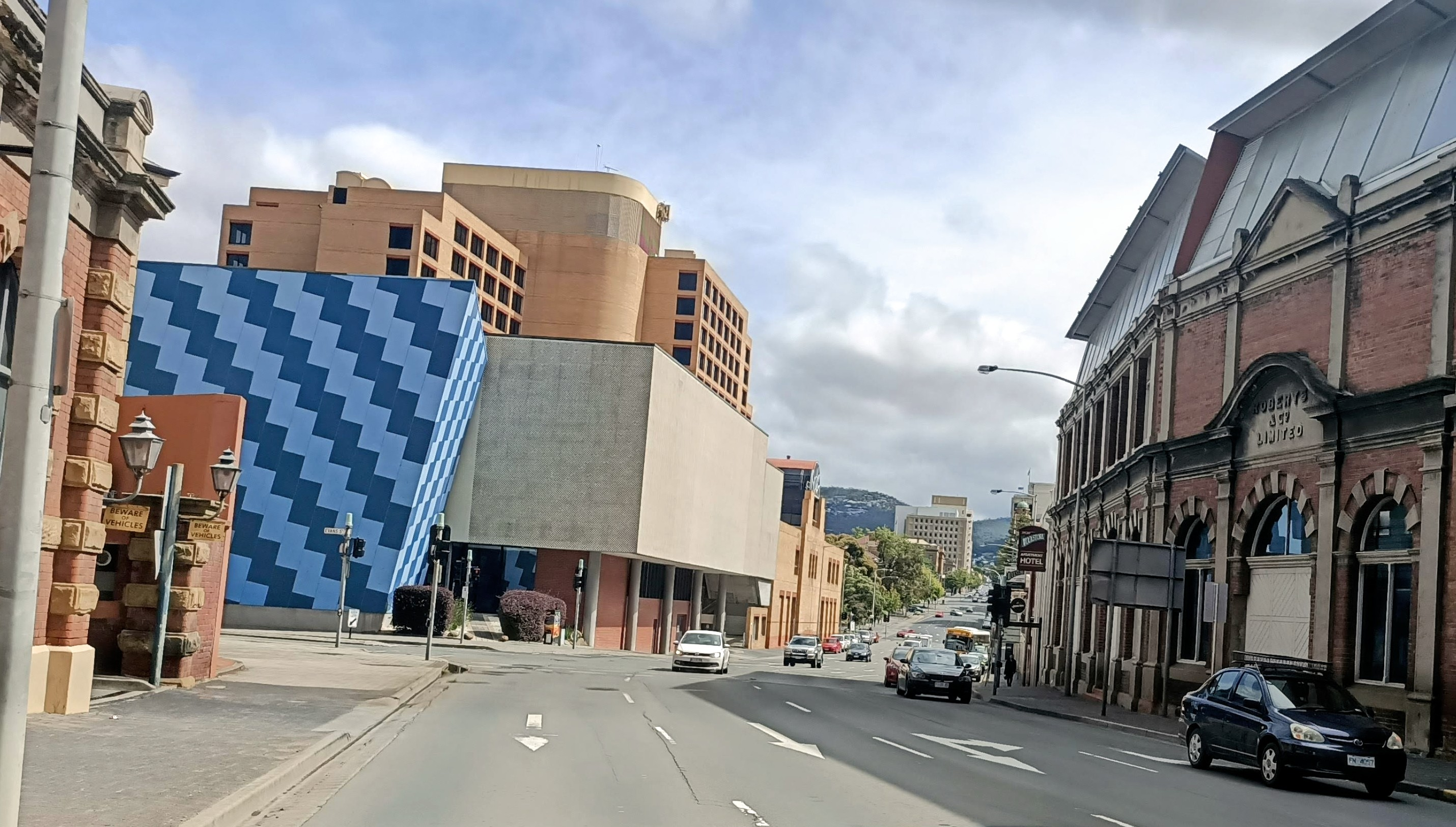
The concert hall's decorative exterior wall (left), seen from Macquarie Street

In response to its challenging CBD location, the hall’s original design placed a strong emphasis on acoustics, with subsequent improvements made over time to meet the changing needs of the TSO.

=== Initial design and early challenges ===
Situated between two of Hobart's busiest arterial roads, Davey and Macquarie streets, the hall's design required significant external sound insulation. Developed with acoustic consultants Arup and Peter Griffiths, the original design featured a tall interior volume and curved, precast concrete walls for resonance and sound diffusion. Feature materials included Tasmanian timbers for the flooring and custom-designed wool seating.

Despite praise for its design, the hall faced acoustic problems from its opening. While the audience experience was vibrant and resonant, the on-stage acoustics made it difficult for musicians to hear each other clearly. These issues were attributed to incomplete acoustic dampening systems, the full implementation of which was delayed by budget constraints.

=== 2009 interim upgrades ===
To address the on-stage hearing issues, the TSO implemented a staged improvement plan in 2009. The first stage involved installing a wooden acoustic screen around the orchestra to enhance ensemble cohesion. This was followed by the introduction of raised platforms to improve conductor visibility. At the time, TSO representatives noted the changes produced a noticeably "tighter and warmer sound".

=== 2020 major redevelopment ===
In 2020, the hall underwent a major redevelopment to install a variable acoustics system, fulfilling an ambition from the original design. Led by acoustician Andrew Nicol, the project allows the hall's reverberation to be mechanically adjusted. The system uses 650 m^{2} (7,000 sq ft) of motorised velour wool banners that can be deployed or retracted from hidden compartments, along with new horizontal timber sound-reflecting blades on the stage walls.

The upgrades enable the hall's acoustic profile to be fine-tuned for a broader range of music, from chamber and early music to full symphonic and amplified works. According to Nicol, the changes provide greater "musical detail, improved ensemble, [and] greater crispness when required". The new elements were visually integrated with the original architecture in consultation with original designer Garry Forward. In addition to improving live performances, the variable acoustics significantly enhanced the hall's function as a recording venue for national broadcasts, particularly for ABC Classic.

== Macquarie Point stadium proposal ==
In 2024, the Tasmanian Government's proposal to build a 23,000-seat stadium at Macquarie Point became a significant concern for the TSO. The proposed site for the Tasmania Devils AFL team is located approximately 170 m (560 ft) from the Federation Concert Hall's stage, prompting the TSO to voice concerns about acoustic interference with its performances, recordings, and daily operations. The TSO noted the hall's status as a premier cultural institution that had recently received a A$1.3 million acoustic upgrade and reaches over six million listeners annually through broadcasts and recordings.

To substantiate its concerns, the TSO commissioned independent acoustic assessments. The studies found that stadium events would expose the hall to significant sound spill from crowds, PA systems, and sirens, as well as low-frequency vibrations transmitted through the ground. TSO chief executive Caroline Sharpen described the close proximity of a concert hall to a major outdoor stadium as "unprecedented" globally. She also expressed doubt regarding the reliability of "management mitigation" (such as coordinating event schedules), citing a lack of guaranteed enforcement.

As the proposal, designated a state-significant development, moved towards a vote in the Tasmanian Parliament, the TSO broadened its public opposition. In November 2024, it partnered with the Tasmanian Returned and Services League (RSL) to hold a joint vigil and concert. The alliance was formed around shared concerns over the stadium's siting, with the RSL objecting to its impact on the adjacent Hobart Cenotaph.

== Function and economic impact ==
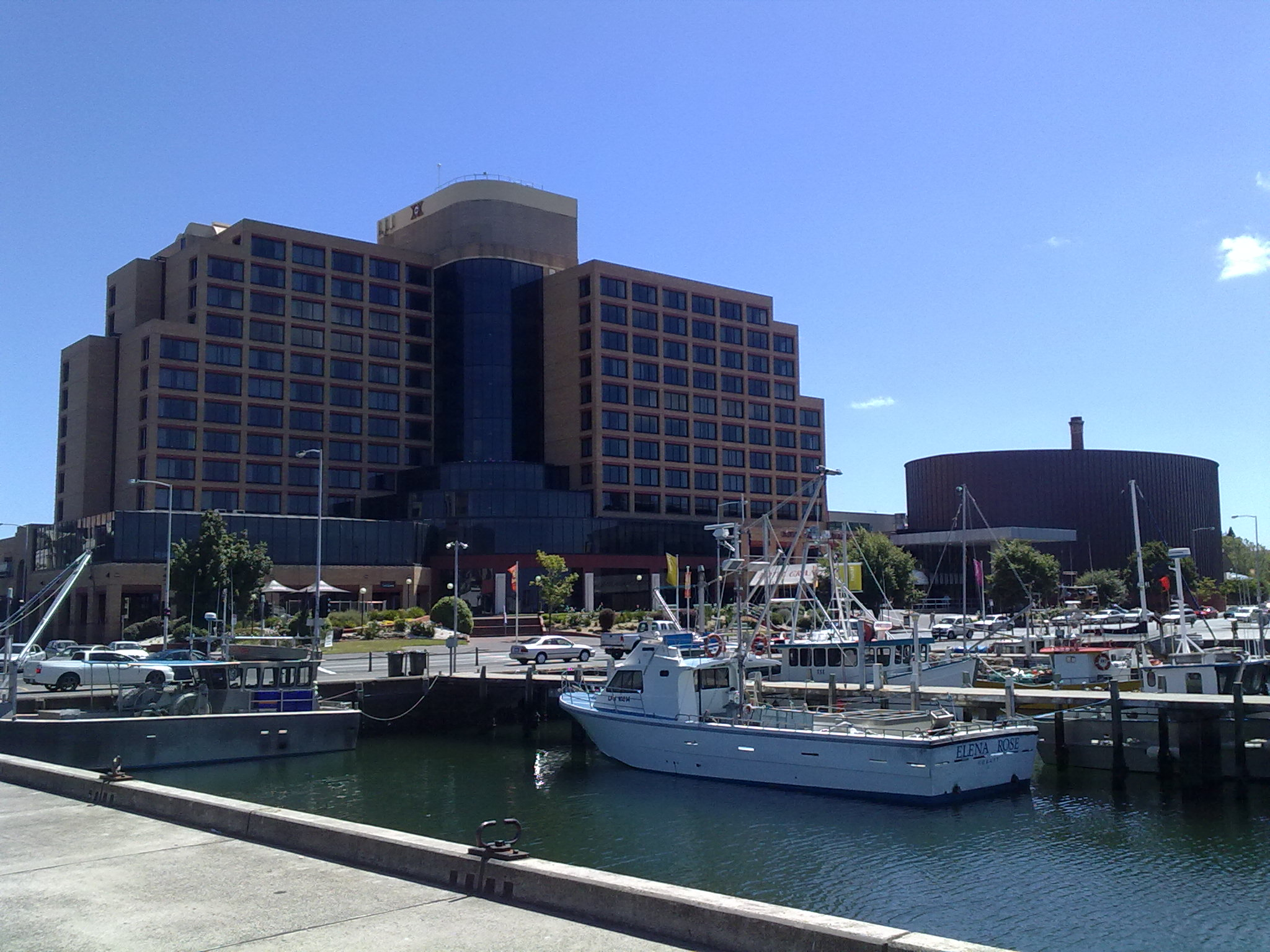
The Hall and Hotel Grand Chancellor from Sullivan's Cove

While serving primarily as the home of the TSO, the Federation Concert Hall forms the northeastern exterior of the Hotel Grand Chancellor and functions as its main conference and event space. The hall's opening greatly enhanced Hobart’s convention hosting capabilities, increasing maximum delegate capacity from 600 at Wrest Point Casino to 1,100. According to hotel general manager Mike Ryan, the venue’s success has had broader economic benefits for Hobart’s hospitality sector, generating nearly 100 part-time jobs and increasing bookings at hotels across the city.

== Notable performances ==
Since its opening, the Federation Concert Hall has hosted a range of significant performances, including:

- 7 October 2000: Inaugural concert by the Tasmanian Symphony Orchestra (TSO), featuring works by Milhaud, Tomasi and Tchaikovsky, marking the hall's official opening.
- 2000–present: Regular subscription seasons by the TSO, including world premieres by Australian composers and recordings for ABC Classic.
- 2001–present: Performances by visiting artists and ensembles, including Richard Tognetti, Slava Grigoryan, Sara Macliver, and touring international chamber groups.
- 2005: Performance of Peter Sculthorpe’s Requiem under the composer’s direction.
- 2014: TSO's live soundtrack performance of The Hobbit: The Desolation of Smaug as part of a live film concert series.
- 2020: TSO digital concerts and livestreamed performances during the COVID-19 pandemic, with the hall repurposed for broadcast and socially distanced events.
- 2023: TSO’s 75th Anniversary Gala Concert, with a commissioned new work by Australian composer Liza Lim and the launch of archival retrospectives.

== See also ==
- Tasmanian Symphony Orchestra
- Odeon Theatre, Hobart
- Hotel Grand Chancellor, Hobart
- Salamanca Place
- Sullivans Cove
