= Odeon Theatre, Hobart =

Historic theatre in Tasmania, Australia

Odeon
- The Strand Theatre, ABC Odeon Theatre
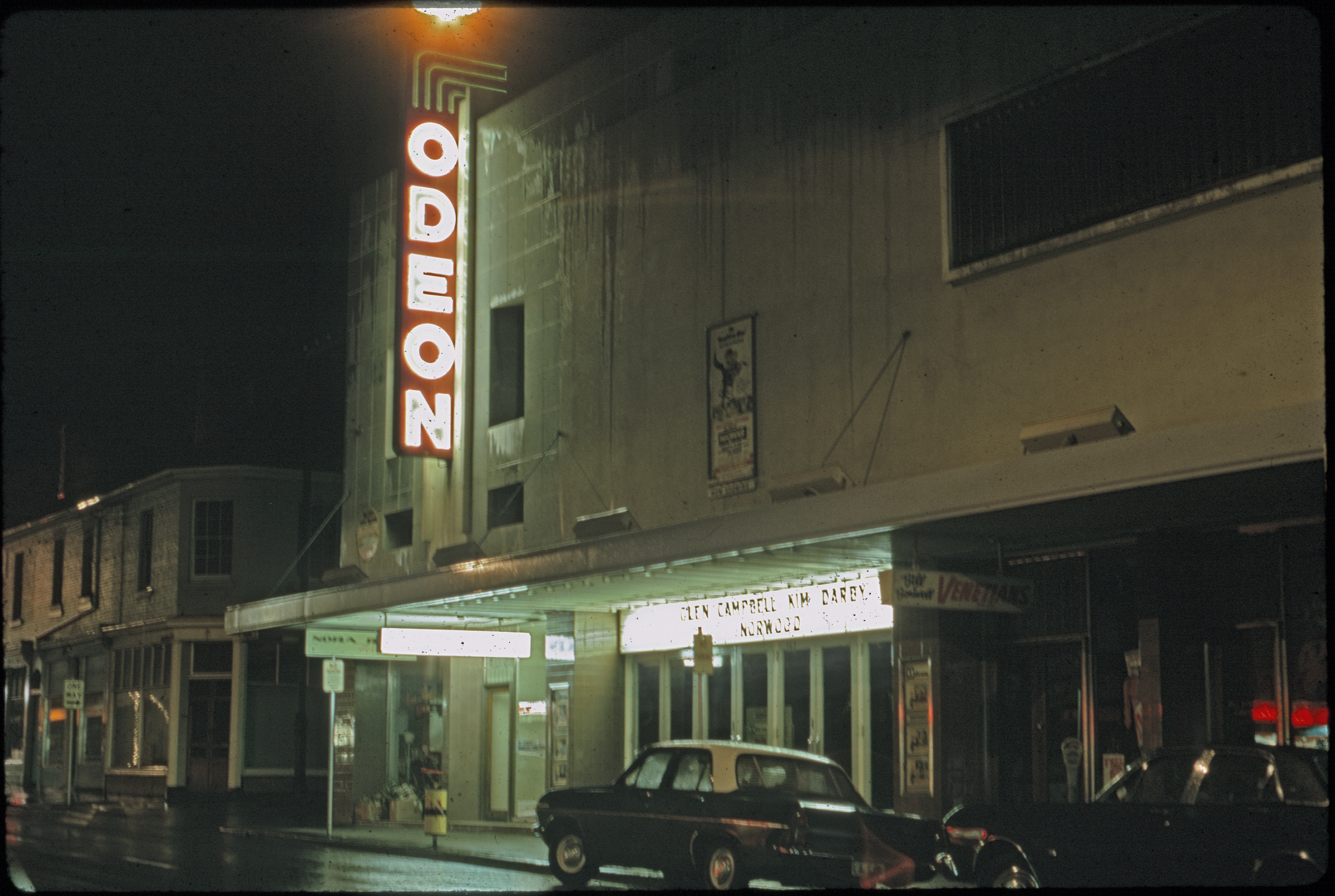
- Odeon Theatre at night, 1970s
- Interactive map of Odeon
- Address: 167 Liverpool Street; Hobart, Tasmania; Australia
- Coordinates: 42°52′59.4″S 147°19′29.27″E
- Owner: Riverlee DarkLab
- Capacity: 1,690
- Current use: live entertainment

Construction
- Opened: 21 May 1916; 110 years ago
- Rebuilt: 1956
- Years active: 1916-1970, 2011-present
- Architects: George Stanley Crisp (1916); Guy Crick & Associates (1956)

Website
- Official site

The Odeon (formerly known as The Strand Theatre or The Odeon Theatre ) is a historic former cinema and current live entertainment venue in the city of Hobart, Tasmania, Australia.

== History ==
Tasmanian entrepreneur E.J. Miller envisioned a world-class picture theatre in Hobart after witnessing the rising popularity of silent films in vaudeville programming at Zeehan's Gaiety Theatre and Theatre Royal. Miller, whose wealth was derived from the lucrative Zeehan mineral field, travelled to the United States, visited major cities and studied the latest advancements in picture theatre designs. On his return to Tasmania he engaged with Hobart architect George Stanley Crisp, who had previously designed the Art Nouveau Palace Theatre opposite the Hobart GPO on Elizabeth Street. Located on the corner of Liverpool Street and Watchorn Street, Miller's original theatre design was intended to be a replica of The Strand in New York.

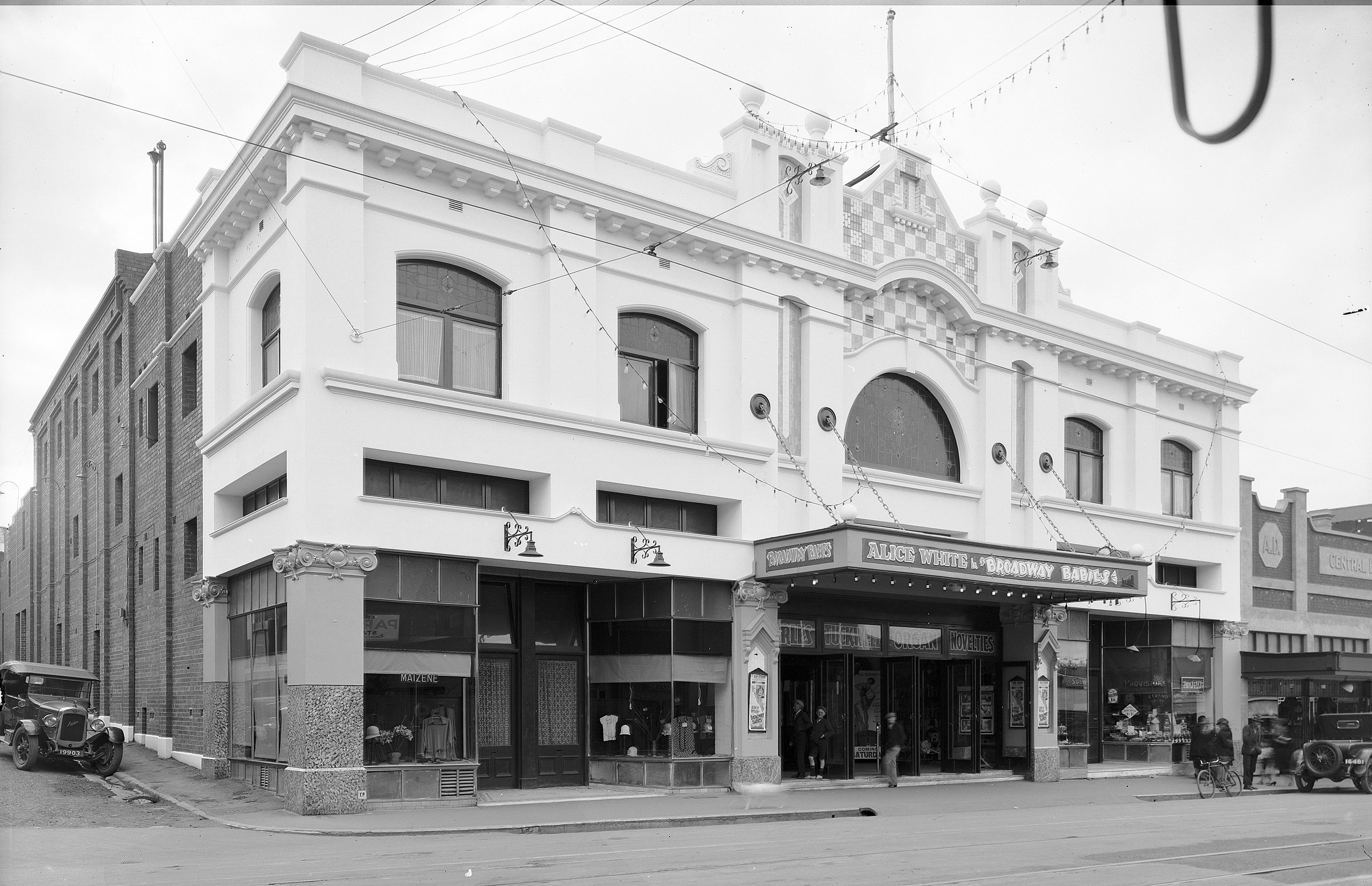
The original façade of The Strand pictured in 1929, featuring a checkered parapet, composite order pilasters, leadlight windows and wrought iron lanterns

=== The Strand Theatre ===
An exceptional example of the Federation Free Classical style, the building featured an iconic checkered parapet, composite order pilasters, decorative cornices, leadlight windows and wrought iron lanterns. Internally, it featured seating for 1,200 people (719 in the stalls and 481 in the dress circle), a Tasmanian Blackwood staircase and dress circle, Wunderlich ceilings, three cloak rooms, immersive wall murals, as well as fixtures and fittings manufactured in Glenorchy. Built as a silent picture house, when The Strand Theatre opened on May 22, 1916, mayor L.H. Macleod declared "this is undoubtedly the finest building in Tasmania". The venue was equipped with state-of-the-art technology, including dimmable atmospheric lighting, early electric ticketing machines, projection equipment imported from Britain and a six-rank Wurlitzer organ, the only of its kind in Tasmania. Located at the west end of Hobart's CBD along the busy Liverpool Street tram line and directly opposite His Majesty's Theatre, locals referred to the "west end" when visiting the pictures or theatre. (Note: Village Cinemas capitalised on the "West End" namesake in 1976, naming Tasmania's first multiplex on nearby Collins Street the West End Twin. It was expanded to 7 screens and renamed Village Cinemas in 1988.)

From 1918 to 1920, nimbyism lead to some residents demanding the government set up a Board of Censors to protect Tasmanian audiences from the "moral decay" associated with the show business world, escalating after a screening of Enlighten Thy Daughter at The Strand in 1920. The board was dissolved when the exhibitor complained of reduced patronage.

The cinema was taken over by Union Theatres, remodelled and relaunched with the Marx Brothers film The Cocoanuts in 1929. Sound equipment was installed and the venue was colloquially referred to as the "New Strand Theatre".

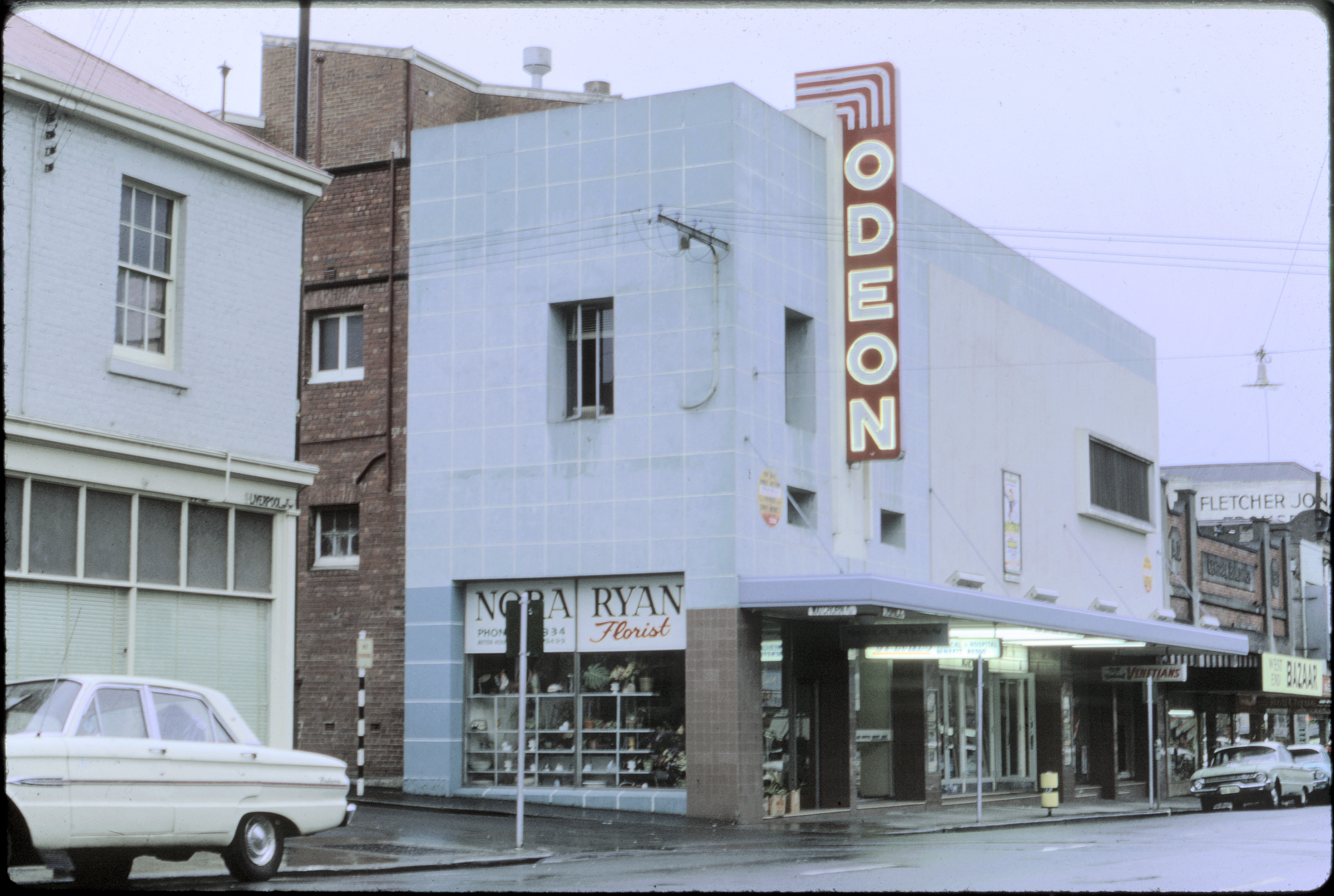
The modernisation of the Odeon Theatre resulted in the exterior being concealed in cladding. Pictured in the 1970s

=== Modernisation as the Odeon ===
In the mid-1950s, then-exhibitor Greater Union engaged with Sydney-based architects Guy Crick & Associates to modernise the theatre. The Strand underwent serious alterations, leaving the building both internally and externally unrecognisable. The façade was covered in rainscreen cladding to present in a modernist style. To achieve this effect, its cornices and pilasters were chiseled back, its parapet was partially levelled, leadlight windows discarded and wrought iron features removed. Modernist neon signage was erected. It reopened as the Odeon Theatre in 1956, the year of the Melbourne Olympics which saw the introduction of television across Australia. Although branded as "The Theatre of Tomorrow", Greater Union did not foresee the lasting effect of television.

=== ABC Odeon Theatre ===
The Odeon fell into financial hardship and was purchased by the ABC in 1970, becoming a recording studio for ABC Radio. During the ABC's tenureship, it was known as the ABC Odeon Theatre, and internally referred to as Studio 720. At some point, pieces of cladding were removed to reveal several windows, including the central arch, to allow more light into the upstairs foyer. It became the home of the Tasmanian Symphony Orchestra (TSO) in 1973. The TSO broadcast many radio and television performances from the theatre and recorded several albums. In 1978, vocalist Judith Durham of The Seekers and pianist Ron Edgeworth recorded material for their live album, The Hot Jazz Duo at the theatre. Other musicians to record at the Odeon include Larry Sitsky, Jan Sedivka, Ade Monsbourgh, Judi Connelli, Suzanne Johnston, Guy Noble, Deborah Conway, George Dreyfus, Scared Weird Little Guys, David Porcelijn, James Ledger, tenor Donald Smith, composer Michael Smetanin and the Australian Rosny Children's Choir. An ABC Shop occupied the Watchorn Street corner shopfront in the 1990s.

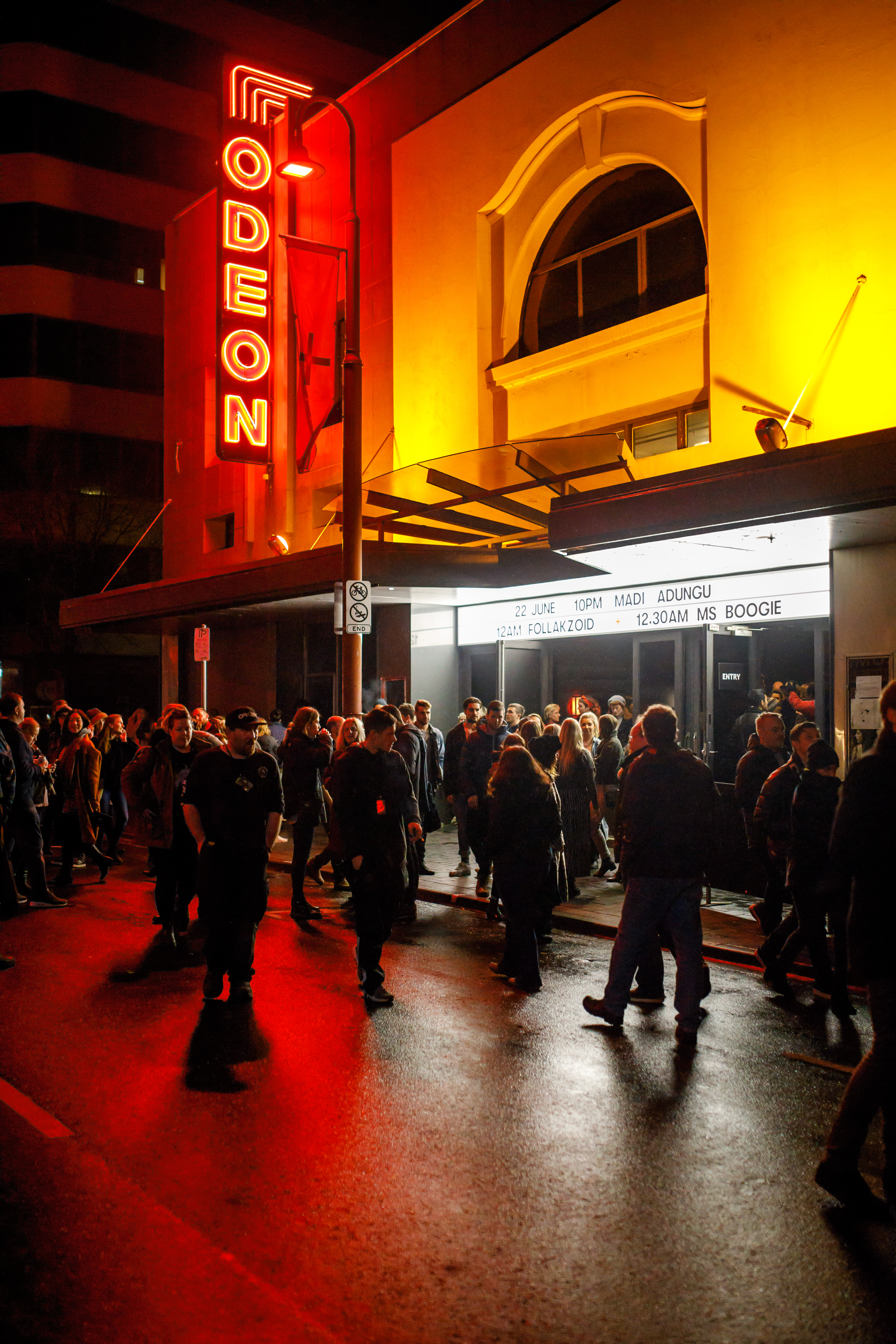
LED signage based on the original 1956 neon was installed in 2018

Over time, the world-class orchestra outgrew the theatre's amenities, with the dressing rooms and backstage facilities noted as being especially inadequate. After 28 years, the TSO relocated to Federation Concert Hall in 2001. The Odeon was then purchased by the Christian City Church, who renovated the interior and restored many of the original Federation-era features.

=== Riverlee and DarkLab redevelopment ===
In 2009, the Christian City Church sold the Odeon to Melbourne-based developer Riverlee. The building remained dormant for several years until it reopened as a live entertainment venue, charged by events curated for the MONA FOMA and Dark Mofo festivals. Hobart City Council gave permission for the building to be partially demolished in 2015. Initially, Riverlee planned to develop the building into a $69 million 11-story office tower accommodating some 1,850 workers, and included shops, restaurants and car parking. The original building façade, disfigured beneath its 1950s cladding, was required to be retained and restored.

Riverlee acquired more properties on the block bound by Liverpool Street, Murray Street, and Watchorn Street that contain the Odeon Theatre and Tattersalls Hotel. The site has an 80 metres (260 ft) frontage along Liverpool Street. A town planning permit has been obtained for a commercial building of over 20,000 square metres (220,000 sq ft) net lettable area.

In 2019, the Odeon and surrounding "Hanging Garden" cultural precinct underwent a $5 million mixed-use redevelopment. The scheme was developed in partnership with DarkLab, a subsidiary of the Museum of Old and New Art, which works on creative projects outside the usual scope of Mona.

==== 2022 masterplan ====
In September 2022, Riveree and DarkLab unveiled a new masterplan for the Hanging Garden Precinct. Designed by Melbourne-based architects Fender Katsalidis with support from Six Degrees Architects, the new development outlines retaining and restoring the Odeon Theatre auditorium, whilst developing a fifteen story, "180+ key hotel" directly above the upper lobby area.

== Film premieres ==
During its tenure as The Strand, the theatre hosted Tasmanian premieres for many Australian-made films, including Jewelled Nights (1925), which was attended by author Marie Bjelke Petersen, future-Prime Minister Joseph Lyons (then-Premier of Tasmania), Dame Enid Lyons and Lord Mayor Francis Valentine. Other Tasmanian premieres included The Squatter's Daughter, with a special appearance from actress Jocelyn Howarth, A Son Is Born and the Australian premiere of Wherever She Goes (1951), a film about the life Zeehan-born pianist Eileen Joyce, which was introduced by Tasmanian Premier Robert Cosgrove. Based on the novel by Nan Chauncy, the Tasmanian feature film They Found a Cave premiered at the Odeon Theatre on 20 December 1962.

== Orchestra pit ==
The orchestra pit at the Odeon originally served as the setting for live musical accompaniment to silent film screenings. Adding a sense of grandeur and sophistication to the viewing experience, The Strand Orchestra played a significant role in enhancing the emotional and dramatic tone of films and vaudeville acts, adding depth and atmosphere to the presentations.

With the advent of talkies in the late 1920s, demand for live musical accompaniment declined, leading to the disbanding of The Strand Orchestra by the mid-1930s. By 1940, the theatre’s Wurlitzer organ, another key musical component, was no longer used as film soundtracks became standard. The last recorded use of the orchestra pit for live musical entertainment occurred in 1957, when it was repurposed for a fundraising event supporting a contestant for the Miss Australia competition, specifically a Miss Tasmania contestant named "Miss Greater Union Theatres".

In later years, the pit was occasionally utilised by the Tasmanian Symphony Orchestra (TSO), underscoring its adaptability for various types of live performances beyond its original cinematic function.

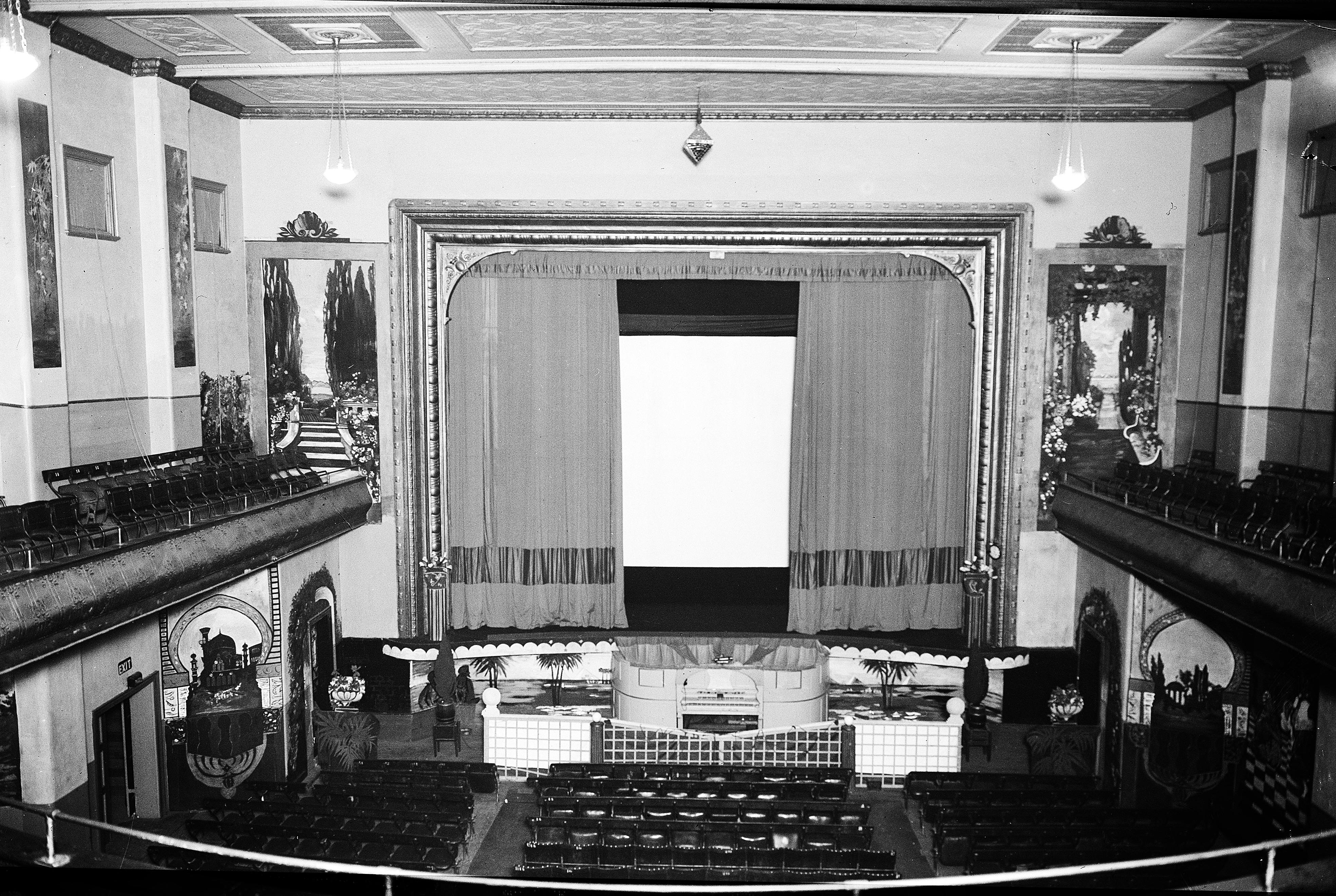
Auditorium interior: proscenium arch, horseshoe mezzanine, wall murals, and Wurlitzer organ, c. 1929

=== Wurlitzer organ ===
The Strand Theatre's six-rank Wurlitzer organ was installed on 16 November 1918 by organ builder J.E. Dodd. Between 1920 and 1928, it was operated by Ben Corrick, who also conducted The Strand Orchestra, sometimes from behind the organ’s console. In 1929, Fincham and Sons restored the organ as part of a theatre remodel. The console’s design was modified to a lower height and updated to emulate the popular "horseshoe style" of theatre organs while retaining the straight stop rails, though the functionality of roll players was discontinued. Renowned theatre organist Manny Aarons reopened the restored instrument in 1929.

The organ gradually fell into disuse in the late 1930s due to the dominance of sound films and was removed in 1948. It was subsequently reinstalled in the Hurstville Presbyterian Church, New South Wales, Australia.

== Contemporary use ==
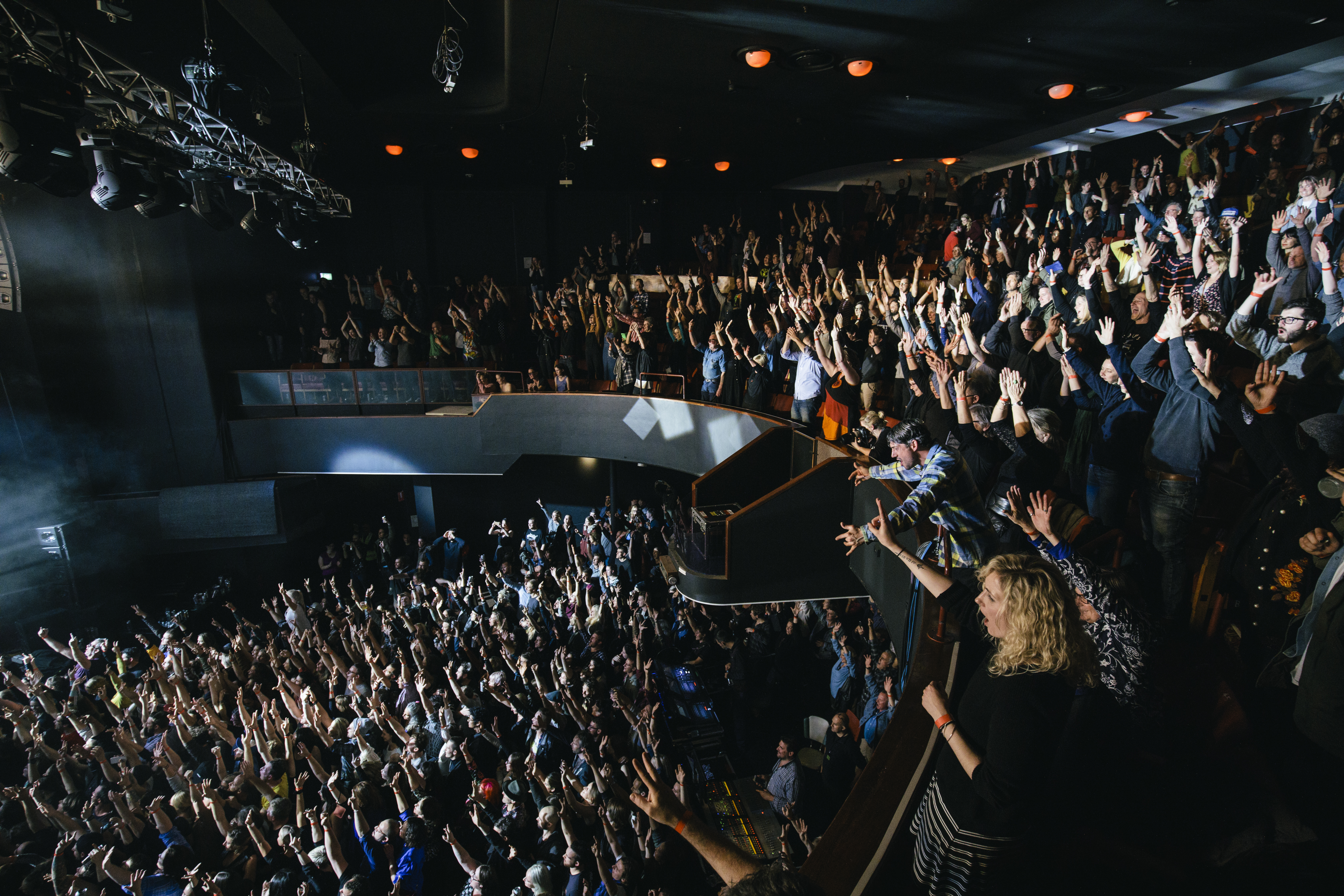
AB Original performing at Dark Mofo, c. 2017

Following a sold-out show by Queens of the Stone Age in 2014, the Odeon Theatre has served as a regular venue for prominent festivals, including MONA FOMA and Dark Mofo. Performers at the Odeon have included Laurie Anderson, Nick Cave, Sarah Blasko, Archie Roach, Paul Kelly, King Gizzard & the Lizard Wizard, Cate Le Bon, Sharon Van Etten, Nick Murphy, Tim Minchin, Everclear, The Tea Party, The Dillinger Escape Plan, Einstürzende Neubauten, and Xavier Rudd.

The Odeon Theatre is also a venue for Hobart’s Festival of Voices, featuring live performances, vocal workshops, and choral presentations that attract both local and visiting participants. The venue has hosted experimental music and multimedia installations as part of MONA FOMA and Dark Mofo, known for their diverse and contemporary programming.

The theatre has also been a platform for prominent comedians. Bill Bailey has performed at the Odeon, and in 2024, Tom Gleeson presented his show "Gear". The 2024 Hobart Festival of Comedy featured comedians such as Urzila Carlson and Reuben Kaye. The theatre continues to play a significant role in Hobart’s live performance scene, providing a space for a broad spectrum of music, theatre, and festival events.

== Gallery ==
All images have been sourced from the Tasmanian Archive and Heritage Office.

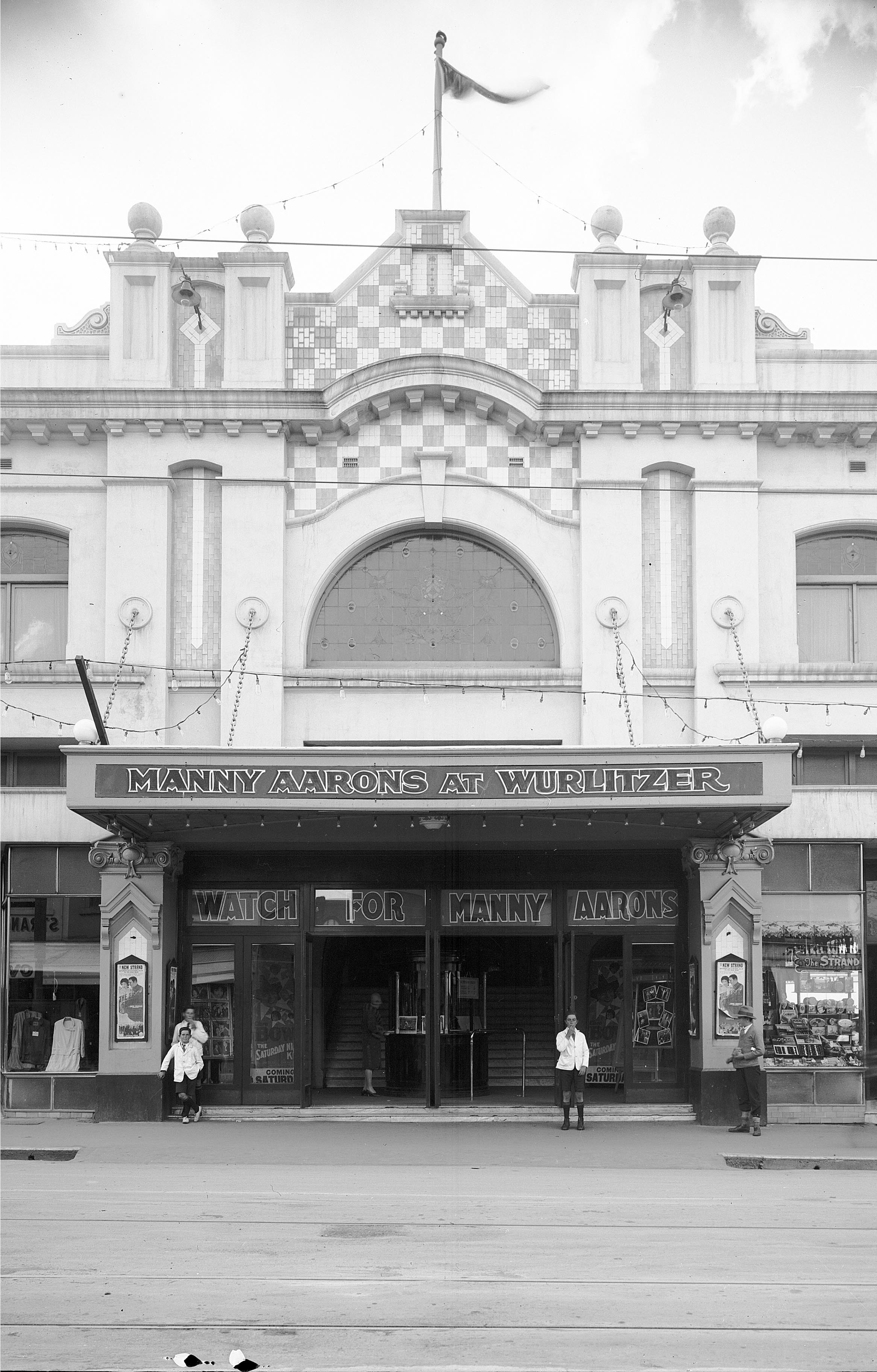
Image showcasing the theatre's iconic checkered parapet and led light windows. Marquee advertising guest Wurlitzer organist, Manny Aarons

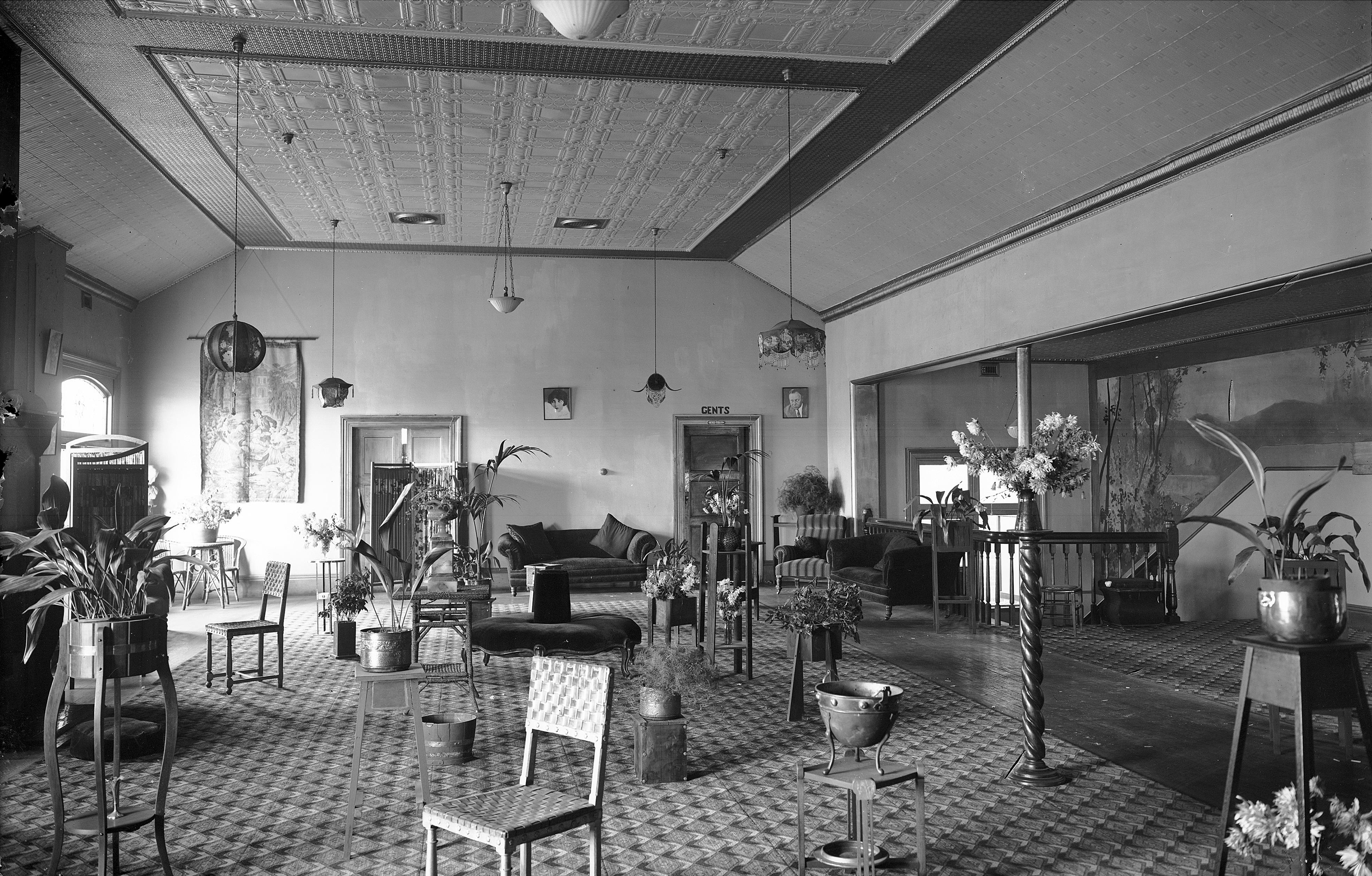
Interior upstairs foyer featuring a Wunderlich ceiling, blackwood staircase, carpets, lamps, lighting fixtures, paintings, urns and plants

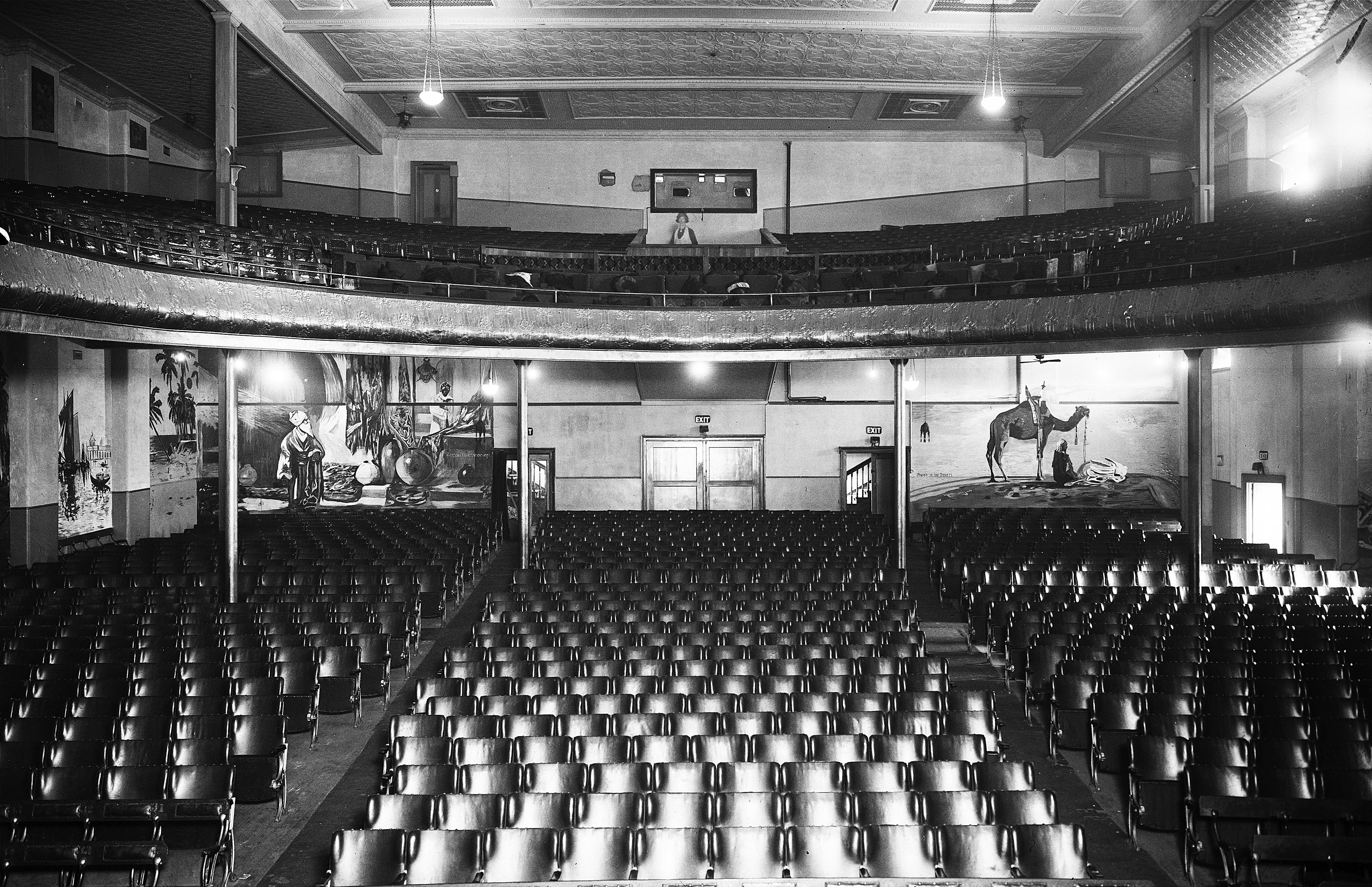
Interior of the auditorium facing the stalls, showcasing its blackwood mezzanine, Wunderlich ceiling and wall murals

== See also ==
List of theatres in Hobart

== Sources ==
- Corby, Phil (2017). "The Picture Theatre Orchestra: A Tasmanian Perspective". Cinema Record Quarterly Journal. No. 94 (2 ed.). ISSN 1443-3664.
- Martell, Earl (December 2018). "Strand/Odeon Theatre". Cinema Record Quarterly Journal. No. 100 (4 ed.). ISSN 1443-3664.
