= David F. Case =

American novelist (1937–2018)

- Born: David Francis Case; December 22, 1937; New York City, U.S.
- Died: February 3, 2018 (aged 80); London, England
- Occupations: Novelist, short story writer
- Writing career
- Genres: horror, Fantasy, Western fiction

David Francis Case (22 December 1937 – 3 February 2018) was an American writer of short stories and novels.

== Biography ==
Case, labeled a classicist by his colleague and friend Ramsey Campbell, uses graphic imagery to convey as directly as possible what the character feels. His work, as in "The Hunter", prefigures the early novels of David Morrell by several years.

Case vanished from the horror field for a decade after the publication of Fengriffen. In 1980, he returned with his werewolf novel Wolf Tracks, and the following year Arkham House published his work The Third Grave. Almost twenty years passed before he released another collection, Brotherly Love.

His collection Brotherly Love and Other Tales of Faith and Knowledge was published by Pumpkin Books in the late 1990s.

His novel Fengriffen was adapted into the film And Now the Screaming Starts! (1973) by director Roy Ward Baker for Amicus Productions. A Gothic melodrama involving an ancient curse and vengeful spirits. The cast included actors Peter Cushing, Herbert Lom, Patrick Magee, Stephanie Beacham, Ian Ogilvy and Guy Rolfe, along with an early role for Michael Elphick. His werewolf thriller "The Hunter" was adapted into an ABC-TV movie called Scream of the Wolf in 1974, directed by Dan Curtis. It stars Peter Graves and Clint Walker as two long-time friends, but it deviates from its source material.

His first Western, Plumb Drillin', was originally set to be a movie starring Steve McQueen before the actor's untimely death in 1980.

Case died on February 3, 2018, at the age of 80.

== Works ==
=== Novels ===
==== Horror ====
- Fengriffen: A Chilling Tale (1970) aka And Now the Screaming Starts (alternative title reflecting the film adaptation)
- Wolf Tracks (1980)
- The Third Grave (1980)

==== Western ====
- Black Hats
- The Fighting Breed
- Plumb Drillin (reissued as Gold Fever)

=== Short stories ===
- "The Dead End" (1969)
- "The Hunter" (1969)
- "Fengriffen" (1971)
- "The War Is Over" (1988)
- "Cannibal Feast" (1994)
- "Jimmy" (1999)
- "Pelican Cay" (2000)
- "Among the Wolves"
- "The Cell"
- "A Cross to Bear"
- "Neighbours"
- "Reflection"
- "Strange Roots"
- "Brotherly Love"
- "The Foreign Bride"
- "Ogre of the Cleft"
- "Anachrona"
- "Reflection"
- "Twins"
- "The Terrestrial Fancy"
- "Penny Wise"
- "Skulls"
- "The Cave"
- "Penny Wise"
- "Stranger Than You Know"

=== Collections ===
- The Cell: Three Tales of Horror (1969) - Contains the stories "The Cell", "The Hunter", and "The Dead End"
- Fengriffen and Other Stories (1971) – Contains the novel Fengriffen and the stories "Among the Wolves" and "Strange Roots"
- Brotherly Love and Other Tales of Faith and Knowledge (1999) – Contains the stories "Brotherly Love", "The Foreign Bride", "The Ogre of the Cleft", "Jimmy", "Anachrona", and "The Terrestrial Fancy"
- Pelican Cay and Other Disquieting Tales (2010) – Contains the stories "Pelican Cay", "Penny Wise," "Reflection," "Skulls," "The Cannibal Feast," "The War Is Over," "The Cave." (Note: The deluxe, signed edition additionally contains "Penny Wise" (variant draft) and "Twins" [a re-working of a chapter from "Skulls"].)
- Masters of the Weird Tale: David Case (2015) - Contains the stories "Anachrona," "The Cell," "The Dead End," "The Hunter," "Fengriffen," "Among the Wolves," "Strange Roots," "Neighbours," "A Cross to Bear," "Twins," "The War Is Over," "Brotheely Love," "The Foreign Bride," "The Ogre of the Cleft," "Jimmy," "The Terrestrial Fancy," "Stranger Than You Know"
- Fengriffen and Other Gothic Tales (2015) - Contains the stories "Fengriffen," "Anachrona," "The Foreign Bride," "The Dead End"
- The Cell and Other Transmorphic Tales (2015) - Contains "The Cell," "Strange Roots," "Among the Wolves," "A Cross to Bear," "The Hunter"

=== Anthologies containing David Case stories ===
- The 11th Pan Book of Horror Stories (1970)—Contains "The Cell"
- The 12th Pan Book of Horror Stories (1971)—Contains "The Hunter"
- The 13th Pan Book of Horror Stories (1972)—Contains "The Dead End"
- The 14th Pan Book of Horror Stories (1973)—Contains "Strange Roots"
- The 15th Pan Book of Horror Stories (1974)—Contains "Among the Wolves"
- The 19th Pan Book of Horror Stories (1978)—Contains "Neighbors"
- The 22nd Pan Book of Horror Stories (1981)—Contains "A Cross to Bear"
- Fantasy Tales Vol. 8 #16 (1986)—Contains "Twins"
- Fine Frights: Stories That Scared Me (1988)—Contains "The War is Over"
- The Mammoth Book of Short Horror Novels (1988)—Contains Fengriffen
- Dark Voices: The Best from the Pan Book of Horror Stories (1990)—Contains "The Hunter"
- Dark Voices 6: The Pan Book of Horror (1994)—Contains "Cannibal Feast"
- The Mammoth Book of Frankenstein (1994)—Contains "The Dead End"
- The Mammoth Book Of Werewolves (1994)—Contains "The Cell"
- Dark of the Night (1997)—Contains "Reflection"
- Dark Terrors 5 (2000)—Contains "Pelican Cay"
- The Mammoth Book of Best New Horror Volume Eleven (2000)—Contains "Jimmy"
- By Moonlight Only (2003)—Contains alternative and longer version of "Jimmy"
- The Mammoth Book of New Terror (2004)—Contains "Among the Wolves"
- The Mammoth Book Of Wolf Men (2009)—Is A Reprinting Of The Mammoth Book Of Werewolves -Contains "The Cell"
- The Souvenir Book of the World Horror Convention 2010: Brighton Shock!— Contains "The Foreign Bride"
