= Eth Clifford =

American writer

- Born: December 25, 1915; New York, New York, U.S.
- Died: April 1, 2003 (aged 87); Pikesville, Maryland
- Occupation: Writer
- Spouse: David Rosenberg
- Children: 1 daughter
- Writing career
- Pen name: Eth Clifford; Ethel Rosenberg; Ruth Bonn Penn; David Clifford
- Period: 1949–1998
- Genres: Children's, young adult
- Notable works: Flatfoot Fox, Jo-Beth and Mary Rose Mysteries
- Notable awards: 1982 Young Hoosier Award

Ethel Clifford Rosenberg (December 25, 1915 – April 1, 2003) known professionally as Eth Clifford or Ruth Bonn Penn, was an American children's fiction writer, best known as the author of the Flatfoot Fox and Jo-Beth and Mary Rose Mysteries series.

== Life and career ==
Clifford was taught to read in a one-room schoolhouse, and grew up an avid reader. It was when her family moved to Philadelphia that she was able to first avail herself to the public library. At the age of sixteen, she met her future husband, David Rosenberg, at a poetry reading in Brooklyn. While Rosenberg was away, serving in World War II, he encouraged Clifford to begin writing, and she did so, publishing her first novel for adults in 1949, with a sequel of sorts, featuring the recurring character "Uncle Julius", published in 1951. That her married name was Ethel Rosenberg and her first two books prominently featured a character named Julius is a remarkable coincidence, and apparently helped drive her subsequent use of the Eth Clifford byline. Her subsequent books were written for children, and her 1979 novel Help I'm A Prisoner in the Library! earned her the prestigious 1982 Young Hoosier Award.

Together with her husband, she founded David-Stewart Publishing company. When co-authoring a book, the two would write under the portmanteau pen name of David Clifford.

Clifford died on April 1, 2003.

== Publications ==
=== As Ruth Bonn Penn ===
- Mommies are for Loving (1962)
- Unusual Animals of the West (1962)
- Simply Silly (1964)

=== Jo-Beth and Mary Rose Mysteries ===
1. Help! I'm a Prisoner in the Library! (1979)
2. The Dastardly Murder of Dirty Pete (1981)
3. Just Tell Me When We're Dead! (1983)
4. Scared Silly (1988)
5. Never Hit a Ghost with a Baseball Bat (1993)

=== Harvey and Nora ===
1. Harvey's Horrible Snake Disaster! (1984)
2. Harvey's Marvelous Monkey Mystery (1987)
3. Harvey's Wacky Parrot Adventure (1990)
4. Harvey's Mystifying Raccoon Mix-Up (1994)

=== Flatfoot Fox ===
1. Flatfoot Fox and the Case of the Missing Eye (1990)
2. Flatfoot Fox and the Case of the Nosy Otter (1992)
3. Flatfoot Fox and the Case of the Missing Whoooo (1994)
4. Flatfoot Fox and the Case of the Bashful Beaver (1995)
5. Flatfoot Fox and the Case of the Missing Schoolhouse (1997)

=== Other books ===
- Go Fight City Hall (1949) (as by Ethel Rosenberg)
- Uncle Julius and the Angel with Heartburn (1951) (as by Ethel Rosenberg)
- The Year of the Three-Legged Deer (1972)
- Burning Star (1974)
- The Wild One (1974)
- The Curse of Moonraker: A Tale of Survival (1977)
- The Rocking Chair Rebellion (1978)
- The Killer Swan (1980)
- The Strange Reincarnations of Hendrik Verloom (1982)
- The Remembering Box (1985)
- I Never Wanted to Be Famous (1986)
- Leah's Song (1987)
- I Hate Your Guts, Ben Brooster (1989)
- The Summer of the Dancing Horse (1991)
- Will Somebody Please Marry My Sister? (1992)
- Family for Sale (1996)
- Ghost School (1998)
