= Sefer ve Sefel =

Secondhand bookstore in Jerusalem

Coordinates: 31°46′58″N 35°13′06″E

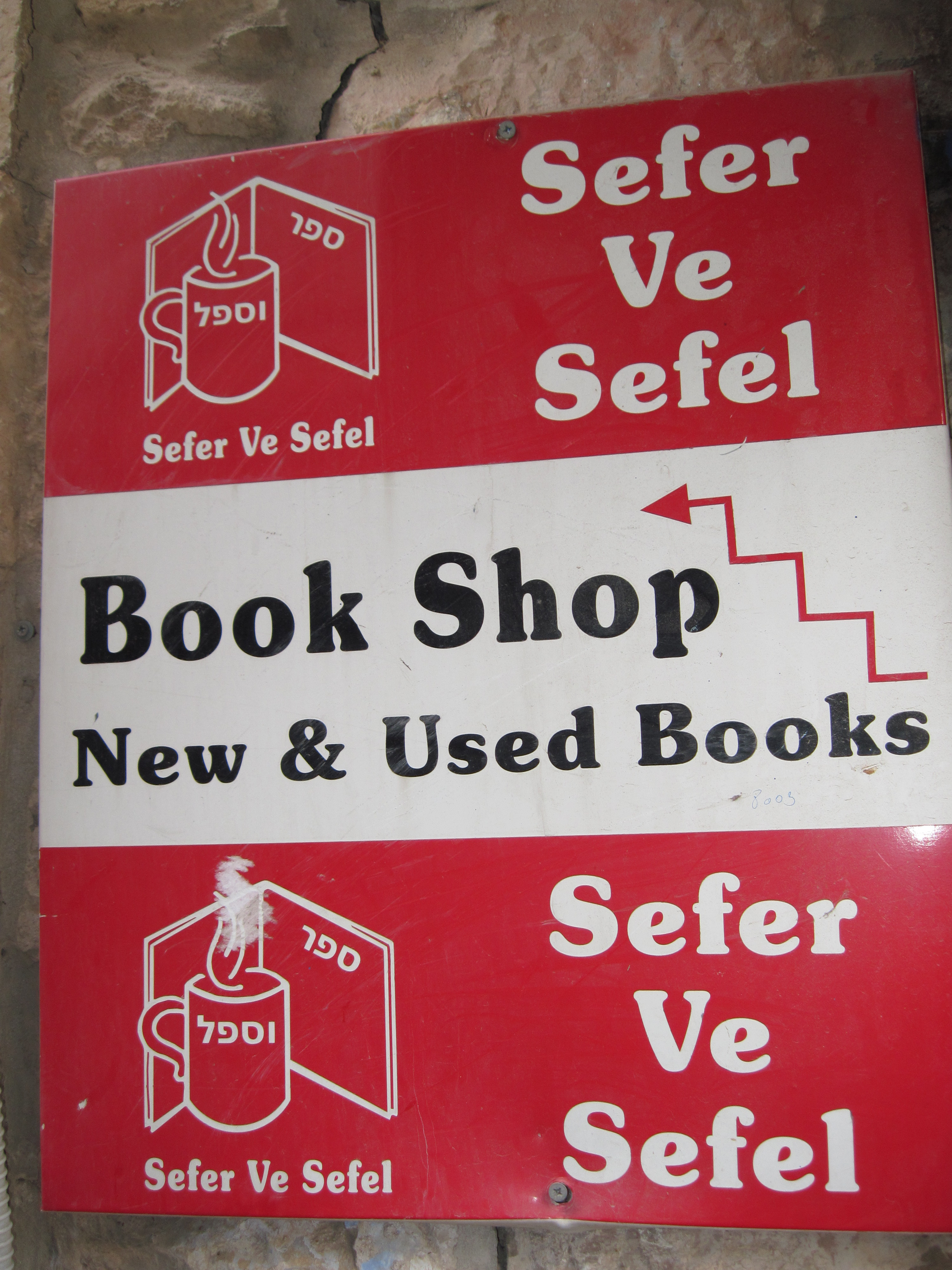
- Sign with store logo
- Founded: 1981; 45 years ago
- Founder: Shai and Judy Robkin
- Headquarters: Jerusalem, Israel
- Number of locations: 1 (2020)
- Key people: Michael and Zia Rose, owners
- Website: www.sefervesefel.com

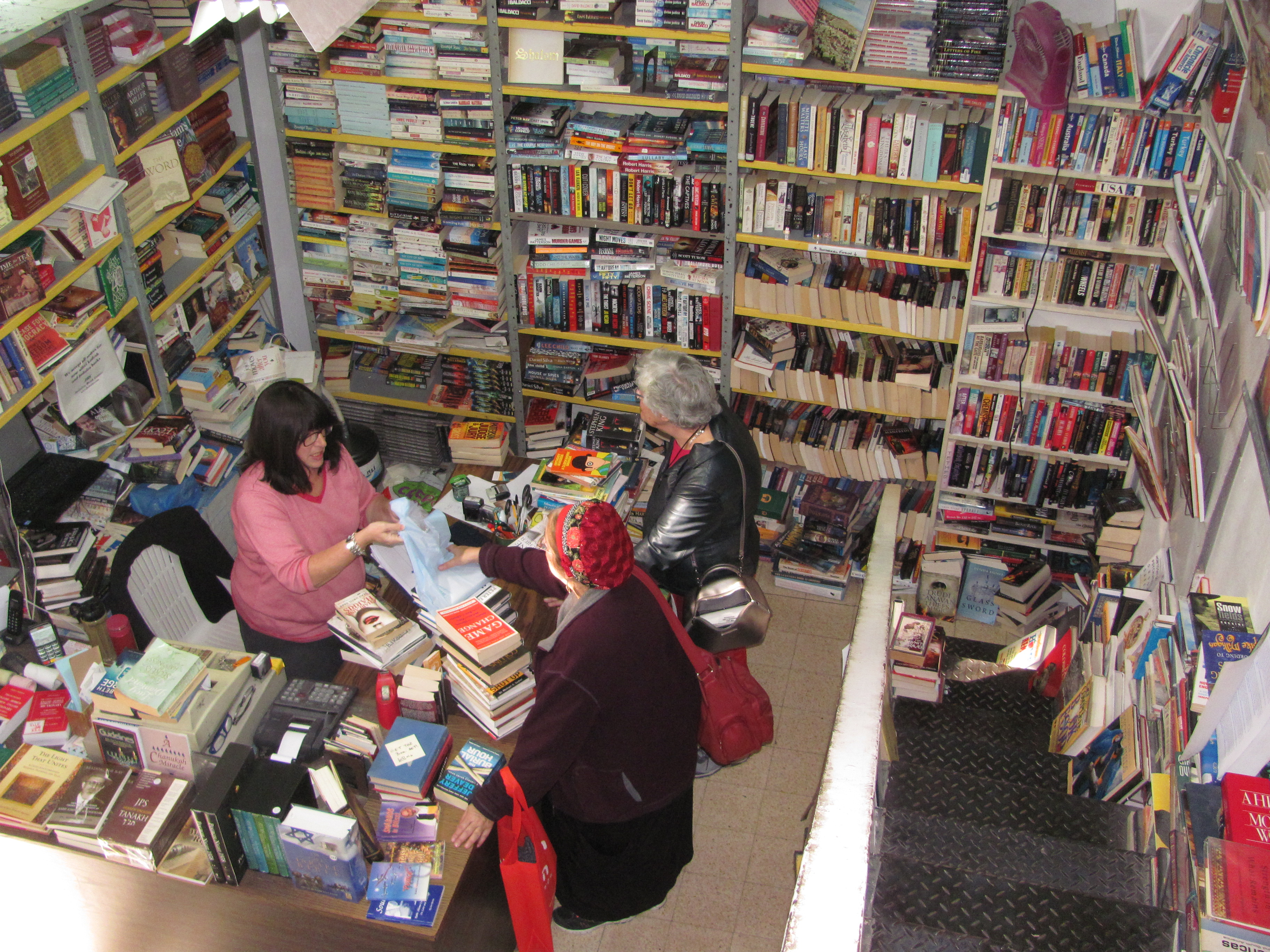
Bookshop interior

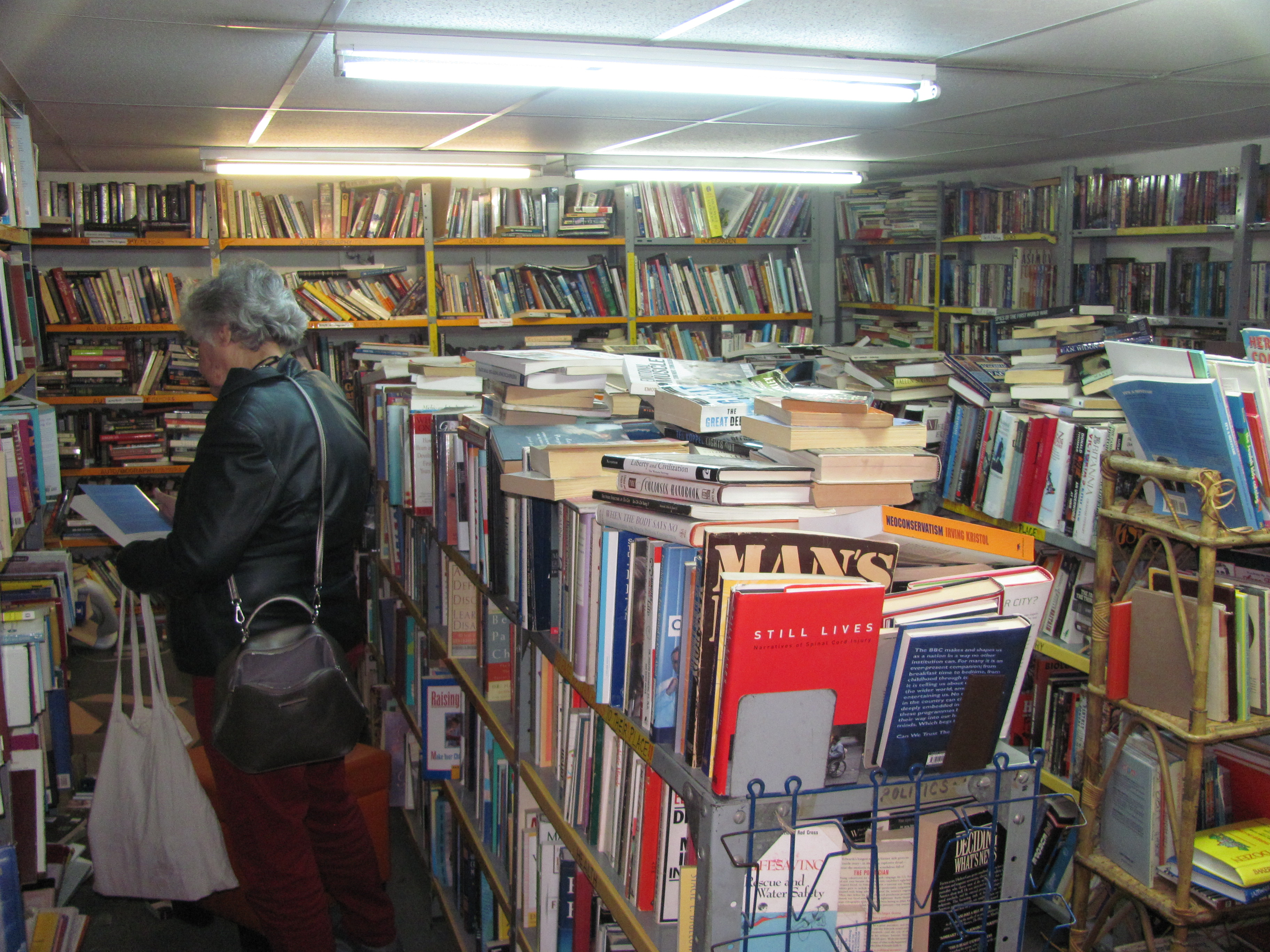
More books in a loft

Sefer ve Sefel (Hebrew: ספר וספל, "Book and Mug") is an English-language secondhand bookshop in downtown Jerusalem, Israel. It was established in 1981 as the first combination bookshop/coffee shop in the country. Though the café was closed in 2002, the shop continues to carry a large selection of used books, with an estimated 26,000 titles in stock. It is frequently cited by guidebooks and travel sites as the best secondhand English bookshop in Jerusalem and the Middle East.

== History ==
Sefer ve Sefel was established in August 1981 by American immigrants Shai and Judy Robkin. It was the first combination bookstore/coffee shop in Israel. The Robkins sold the shop in August 1984 when they returned to the United States. Uri Rucham managed the shop until 2015, when he sold it to Michael and Zia Rose, the present owners.

Located on the second floor of a stone building at 2 Ya'avets Street in downtown Jerusalem, Sefer ve Sefel is noted for its extensive collection of secondhand English-language books, with more than 26,000 titles displayed on two floors. Genres include fiction, English literature, science fiction, New Age, Middle Eastern history and politics, philosophy, Jewish literature, reference works, children's literature, self-help, cookbooks, and more. Shop inventory expanded as customers sold to the store books that they had purchased on the internet or brought with them from overseas.

Sefer ve Sefel's return policy offers store credit for books purchased from its shop. The owners provide assistance and recommendations, and the atmosphere is described as "cozy and inviting".

Sefer ve Sefel is frequently listed in guidebooks and travel sites as the best secondhand English bookshop in Jerusalem and the Middle East.

== Café ==
Sefer ve Sefel originally sold coffee and ice cream in a small café on its balcony. The café's noticeboard was a popular site for announcements of Anglo events and services.

The café was certified as kosher but this was threatened in 1982 when the owner joked about his clientele that "the Israelis liked history, the Americans fiction, and the Orthodox pornography". He was actually referring to books about sex education which were favoured by local Haredi women who preferred not to visit male gynecologists. To convince the rabbinate to maintain the kosher certification, the owner submitted a signed statement that no true pornography would be sold on the premises.

In 2002, the café was closed and the outdoor space was filled with discounted books.

== Sefer ve Sefel Publishing ==
During Rucham's tenure, Sefer ve Sefel operated a small publishing house which reprinted out-of-print books and used books still in demand. Its publications included Legends of Jerusalem, Legends of Judea and Samaria, and Legends of Galilee and Jordan and Sinai by Zev Vilnay; Genesis 1948: The First Arab-Israeli War; The Kuzari: An Argument For The Faith Of Israel by Judah Halevi; History of Jewish Mysticism by Ernst Mueller; Selected Essays by Ahad Ha'am.

== Sources ==
- Friedland, Roger; Hecht, Richard (1996). To Rule Jerusalem. Cambridge University Press. ISBN 9780521440462.
- Humphreys, Andrew (1996). Israel and the Palestinian Territories (3rd ed.). Lonely Planet. ISBN 9780864423993. "Probably Jerusalem's best bookshop is Sefer VeSefel, a creaky little place with floor to ceiling new and second-hand titles, both fiction and nonfiction. It's particularly good on Middle Eastern history and politics and Judaism, and it has a good assortment of used travel guides. It also has a small balcony cafe."
- Jacobs, Daniel (1999). Jerusalem: The Mini Rough Guide. Rough Guides. ISBN 9781858285795. "Jerusalem's best selection of secondhand books in English, as well as new books, and a small café where you can sit and read them."
- Wheeler, Tony (1990). West Asia on a Shoestring. Lonely Planet. "Sefer VeSefel (meaning 'Mug & Book'), the bookstore on Ya'avetz St, has a cafe noted for its ice cream, noticeboard and magazine collection."
