= Normand Poirier =

American journalist

- Born: Normand Poirier; 1928; Worcester, Massachusetts, United States
- Died: February 3, 1981; New York City, New York, United States
- Occupations: Essayist, journalist, newspaper editor.
- Writing career
- Genre: Non-fiction

Normand Poirier (1928 – February 3, 1981) was an American journalist, essayist, and newspaper editor. His name is often spelled Norman Poirier.

Poirier is noted as one of the first journalists to report on war crimes on Vietnamese civilians by American soldiers during the Vietnam War.

== Early life ==
Normand Poirier was born to French-Canadian parents Raoul Rene Poirier and Therese LaPointe Poirier in Worcester, Massachusetts. Poirier graduated from Cornell University, where he played straight rail billiards.

== Literary career ==
Over the course of his lifetime, Poirier wrote for the Pottstown Mercury, the New York Post, Esquire, Newsday, Life, and The Saturday Evening Post. Having joined the New York Post in 1959, Poirier was considered "a star" reporter of "razor-sharp intellect and acute powers of observation." Poirier's sense of humor as a journalist also led him openly travel and tour Pottstown, Pennsylvania in 1955, while impersonating a Russian officer (the city was off-limits to Russian nationals at the time).

In August 1969, three months before news of the My Lai Massacre broke, Poirier's article An American Atrocity was published by Esquire magazine. The story was one of the first journalistic accounts of a US war crime, detailing the gang-rape of a Vietnamese woman and the murder of 5 Vietnamese civilians by US Marines of the 1st Battalion, 5th Marines in the hamlet of Xuan Ngoc, near Chu Lai on the night of 23 September 1966. Although the magazine sent proofs to major news outlets, it was not picked up by the mainstream media.

== Death and legacy ==
Poirier died on February 3, 1981, at Beth Israel Medical Center in New York City, New York. Credited as one of the first journalists to uncover American soldiers' atrocities during the Vietnam War, Poirier is also noted as the popularizer of and regular at The Lion's Head, an after-hours hangout among New York City writers (including many New Journalism writers)., In Pete Hamill's eulogy to Poirier in the New York Times, he recognizes Poirier as an early influence.

=== Non-fiction ===
Famous essays and articles

- "An American Atrocity". New York: Esquire, 1969.,
