= Hugo Brandt Corstius =

Dutch computer scientist

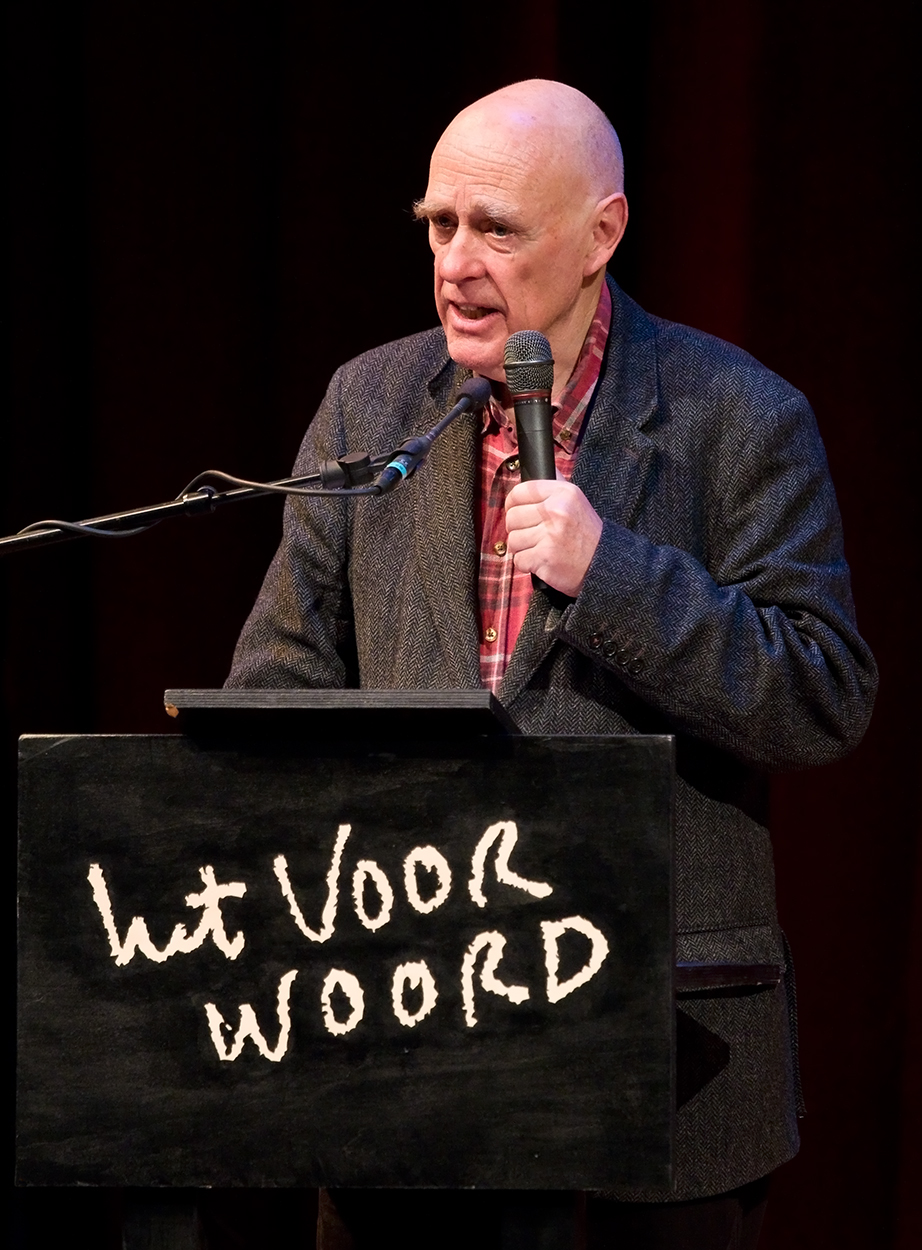
- Hugo Brandt Corstius in 2010
- Born: 29 August 1935; Eindhoven, Netherlands
- Died: 28 February 2014 (aged 78); Amsterdam, Netherlands
- Occupations: Linguist; Writer; Scientist
- Known for: Opperlandse taal- & letterkunde

Hugo Brandt Corstius (29 August 1935 – 28 February 2014) was a Dutch author, known for his achievements in both literature and science.

In 1970, he was awarded a PhD on the subject of computational linguistics. He was employed at the Mathematisch Centrum in Amsterdam. However, to the general public he is mostly known for his writing, in particular as a columnist for Vrij Nederland and de Volkskrant and as linguist and literary critic for Vrij Nederland, de Volkskrant, and NRC Handelsblad.

== Writing and pseudonyms ==
Hugo Brandt Corstius wrote under over sixty different pseudonyms, allonyms and aliases. He claimed each of them to be a component of his character.

In Vrij Nederland he used the pseudonym Piet Grijs and between 1979 and 1986 in de Volkskrant he used the pseudonym Stoker. His other pseudonyms include Battus (in NRC Handelsblad and Vrij Nederland), Raoul Chapkis, Victor Baarn, Dolf Cohen, Maaike Helder, Peter Malenkov and Talisman.

The Battus name was reserved for writing on linguistics and language play, in columns, articles and books. Many forms of word play (palindromes, the longest attested word in Dutch, e-less Dutch, etc. etc.) were bundled in the volume Opperlandse taal- & letterkunde, ("Upperlandic linguistics", where "Upperlandic" is word play on "Netherlandic"), and twenty years later a sequel Opperlans! (deliberate misspelling). Both books are concerned with the form of Dutch words with little regard to meaning. He also wrote De Encyclopedie, a book parodying encyclopedias, containing about 300 pages numbered 1 through 40000 or thereabouts, with many puns, references to non-existent pages and other jokes.

He coined the word "Symmys", an autological word for a palindrome, in his 1991 book Symmys (written under the pseudonym Battus), thus inspiring the SymmyS Awards in the American magazine The Palindromist.

== Prizes ==
- 1966 - Anne Frank Prize for Ik sta op mijn hoofd
- 1978 - Cestoda-prijs
- 1978 - Burgemeester van Grunsven-prijs for his entire works
- 1985 - Busken Huetprijs for Rekenen op taal
- 1987 - P. C. Hooft Award for his entire works

== Personal life ==
His daughter Aaf is a columnist, his daughter Merel is a Montessori teacher and graduate student in Boston, and his son Jelle is also an author, and was a correspondent in Russia. Brandt Corstius died in Amsterdam after a long illness.

== Bibliography ==
- 1966 - De reizen van Pater Key (under pseudonym Raoul Chapkis)
- 1966 - Zes dagen onbedachtzaamheid kan maken dat men eeuwig schreit (pseud. Raoul Chapkis)
- 1966 - Ik sta op mijn hoofd (pseud. Raoul Chapkis)
- 1970 - Exercises in Computational Linguistics (PhD thesis)
- 1970 - Grijsboek, of de nagelaten bekentenissen van Raoul Chapkis
- 1971 - Zinnig tuig
- 1972 - Blijf met je fikken van de luizepoten af!
- 1974 - Algebraïsche taalkunde
- 1975 - A is een letter
- 1975 - Piet Grijs is gek
- 1978 - Computer-taalkunde
- 1978 - Televisie, psychiaters, computers en andere griezelverhalen
- 1978 - De encyclopedie (pseud. Battus)
- 1981 - ...honderd. Ik kom!
- 1981 - Opperlandse taal- & letterkunde
- 1988 - Denk na
- 1991 - Symmys (SYMMYƧ) (pseud. Battus)
- 1995 - De hoofdredacteur
- 1995 - Water en vuur
- 1999 - Het bewustzijn
