= Opperlandse taal- & letterkunde =

1981 book by Hugo Brandt Corstius

- Author: Hugo Brandt Corstius
- Publication date: 1981

Opperlandse taal- & letterkunde (written in 1981) is a book dedicated to peculiarities of the Dutch language. It was written by "Battus", one of many pseudonyms used by Hugo Brandt Corstius. The title means "Upperlandic Language and Linguistics", where "Upperlandic" is word play on "Netherlandic".

== Intended confusion ==
The book has ten chapters, numbered 0 through 9, which use the Dutch language in a humorous way. Chapters are interleaved, with all odd-numbered pages belonging to different chapters than the adjacent even-numbered pages. This confusion is intentional. The two sets of pages are printed in different fonts.

Chapter 0, titled "Programme and Constitution of Upperlandic" explains that "Upperlandic is Dutch on vacation. Upperlandic is Dutch without the awful utility generally attached to that language. Upperlandic words and sentences look like their Dutch counterparts at first glance. But then, Upperlandic is meant for the second glance."

Other chapters of the book include various forms of word play such as palindromes, spoonerisms, the shortest possible sentence to include all letters, the shortest and longest possible words (Dutch allows for word-chaining), chessboard poetry, anagrams, lengthy pieces of prose containing no vowel other than the e, or containing no "tall" letters as on a typewriter (e.g. oeain but not j or b), and so forth.

== Sequels ==
In 2002, a sequel Opperlans! [sic] Taal- & letterkunde appeared. Because the chapters in this new version were even more mystifying, another book, Opperlans woordenboek, was released in 2007 to let readers identify the actual question. It is in fact a list of Upperlandic words with references to the big book – and a number of new words.
