= Clive Sansom =

English-born Tasmanian poet and playwright

- Born: Clive Henry Sansom; 21 June 1910; East Finchley, London, England
- Died: 29 March 1981; Hobart, Tasmania, Australia
- Education: Regent Street Polytechnic; University College London
- Occupations: Poet, playwright
- Spouse: Ruth Large
- Writing career
- Genres: Poetry, drama, children's literature
- Notable works: The Witnesses; The Golden Unicorn

Clive Sansom (21 June 1910 – 29 March 1981) was an English-born Tasmanian poet and playwright. He was also an environmentalist, who became the founding patron of the Tasmanian Wilderness Society.

== Life and work ==
Sansom was born in East Finchley, London, and educated at Southgate County School, where he matriculated in 1926. He worked as a clerk/salesman for an ironworks company until 1934, and then studied speech and drama at the Regent Street Polytechnic and the London Speech Institute under Margaret Gullan. He went on to study phonetics under Daniel Jones at University College London, and joined the London Verse-Speaking Choir. He lectured in speech training at Borough Road Training College, Isleworth, and the Speech Fellowship in 1937–1939, and edited the Speech Fellowship Bulletin (1934–1949). He was also an instructor at the Drama School of the London Academy of Music and Dramatic Art.

Sansom married the poet Ruth Large, a Tasmanian, in 1937, at the Quaker Friends Meeting House in Winchmore Hill. He subsequently joined the Quakers and was a conscientious objector during the Second World War. His best known collection of poems, The Witnesses, tells the life of Jesus of Nazareth from the perspective of those who knew him during his time on earth. It was joint winner of the Festival of Britain poetry prize in 1950 and has been performed all over the world. Clive Sansom had a beautifully modulated speaking voice and was an excellent reader of his own poetry. His series of poems about the life and ministry of Francis of Assisi, though not as well known as The Witnesses, were equally well researched and crafted.

The couple settled in Tasmania in 1949, where they were both supervisors with the Tasmanian Education Department, in charge of its Speech Centre. Sansom was also a committed conservationist and the founding patron of the Tasmanian Wilderness Society. He called himself 'the oldest "greenie" in the business' and fought long and hard to preserve the original Lake Pedder, in Tasmania's south west. He was devastated when the then premier, Eric Reece, refused to accept millions of dollars from the Whitlam Labor government to hold a moratorium, which could have saved the original lake.

As a poet, Sansom was best known for his performance poetry and his verses for children. He also wrote a number of plays. His Passion Play was a novel based around the Oberammergau Passion Play of 1950.

Clive Sansom died following a stroke in Hobart, Tasmania, in 1981. A commemorative volume appeared in 1990.

== Bibliography ==
- In the Midst of Death. Poems (Oxford: privately printed, 1940)
- The Green Dragon and Other Plays, etc. (London: A. & C. Black, [1941]). Children's Theatre No. 3
- Speech Rhymes (London: A. & C. Black, [1942]; reprints to 1974, also in US)
- The Unfailing Spring (poems, London: Favil Press, 1943)
- Choral Speaking ([London], 1947; 2nd e. with annotated list of plays with choruses, London: A. & C. Black, 1959). Speech Fellowship Booklet No. 4
- The Poetry of T. S. Eliot ... Text of a lecture to the Speech Fellowship, etc. ([London]: Speech Fellowship, 1947; reprint 1977)
- Reading Aloud ([London]: Speech Fellowship, 1947). Speech Fellowship Booklet No. 3
- Speech Training as a Career (London: Vawser & Wiles, 1947)
- Speech of Our Time (London, [1948])
- Poetry and Religious Experience. An address given at Friends House, London, 7 March 1948 ([London]: Allen Cullum, 1948)
- The World Turned Upside Down. A modern morality play (London: Frederick Muller, 1948)
- Passion Play etc. (London: Methuen & Co., 1951)
- The Witnesses and Other Poems (London: Methuen & Co., 1956; partial reprint 1971). ISBN 0-416-08360-9
- Chorus Plays (London: A. & C. Black, [1958]). Youth Theatre publication No. 4
- The Cathedral (poems, London: Methuen & Co., 1958)
- Dorset Village (poems, map, London: Methuen & Co., 1962)
- The Golden Unicorn. Poems for children (London: Methuen & Co., 1965)
- Microphone Plays (London/New York: Macmillan/St. Martin's Press, 1965)
- Speech in the Primary School (London: A. & C. Black, 1965; reprints to 1978, later as Speech and Communication in the Primary School). ISBN 0-7136-1836-1
- Return to Magic (poems, London: Leslie Frewin, 1969). ISBN 0-09-097050-0
- More Microphone Plays (London: Macmillan, 1971). ISBN 0-333-11619-4
- An English Year (children's verse with music, London: Chatto & Windus, 1975). ISBN 0-7011-5077-7
- Selected Poems, 1910–1981 ([Tasmania], c. 1981)
- Four Verse Dramas ([Tasmania], c. 1991)
- Francis Of Assisi" Two Cassettes. (Hobart: Spectangle Productions, 1980)
- "Francis Of Assisi: The Sun Of Umbria" (Hobart: Cat & Fiddle Press, 1981. The life of Francis Of Assisi told in verse and prose by Clive Sansom

=== As co-author ===
- With Rodney Bennett: Adventures in Words. Speech training readers. Second series (London: University of London Press, 1939)
- With Rodney Bennett: Adventures in Words. Speech training for Canadian schools (Toronto/London: Clark Irwin & Co./University of London Press, 1940)
- With Richard Harding Graves: The Carpenter's Son. A carol for voices and organ, poem by Clive Sansom (London: Adam & Charles Black, [1949])
- With Walter Stiasny: Two Songs. 1. The Forest Wind. 2. Inscription for an old Tomb. Poems by Clive Sansom (London/New York: Peters/Hinrichsen, [1955])
- With Ann Hamerton: Shepherds' Carol. Words by Clive Sansom (London/New York: J. Curwen & Sons/G. Schirmer, [1959])
- With Richard Harding Graves: The Farmyard. Ten songs with optional mime and movement. Words by Clive Sansom, etc. (London/New York: J. Curwen & Sons/G. Schirmer, [1963.])
- With Arthur Edwin Veal: The Irish Fiddler. Words by Clive Sansom (London: OUP, [1971]). Oxford Choral Songs U 146

=== As editor etc. ===
- With Marjorie Gullen: The Poet Speaks: an anthology for choral speaking (London: Methuen, 1940, reprints to 1957)
- English Heart: an anthology of English lyric poetry ([London]: Falcon Press, [1946])
- Plays in Verse with Spoken Choruses (London: A & C Black, [1947]). Children's Theatre No. 7
- Acting Rhymes (London: A & C Black, 1948, 2nd e. 1975). ISBN 0-7136-1541-9
- Briar Rose and Other Plays with Choruses (London: A & C Black, [1950]). Children's Theatre No. 10
- By Word of Mouth. An anthology of prose for reading aloud (London: Methuen & Co., 1950)
- The World of Poetry. Poets and critics on the art and functions of poetry. Extracts selected and arranged by Clive Sansom (London: Phoenix House, 1959; reprint 1960)
- Helen Power: A Lute with Three Strings. Selected and introduced by Clive Sansom (poems, London: Robert Hale, 1964)
- Counting Rhymes (London: Black, 1974). ISBN 0-7136-1484-6

== External resources ==
- Some poems by Clive Sansom: Retrieved 13 September 2011.
- The verse "Mary of Nazareth" from Sansom's collection The Witnesses: Retrieved 14 September 2011.
- "The Forbidden Room", from Return to Magic: Fairy-Tale Poems (1969).
- The catalogue of the Clive Sansom papers held at the University of Tasmania Library, with a short biography: Retrieved 13 September 2011.
- Australian Dictionary of Biography: Clive Henry Sansom (1910–1981) by Ralph Spaulding.
- Australian Music Centre: Clive Sansom.
