= 20,000 Leagues Under the Sea (disambiguation) =

20,000 Leagues Under the Sea refers to Twenty Thousand Leagues Under the Seas, a classic 1870 science fiction novel by Jules Verne.

20,000 Leagues Under the Sea may also refer to:

- 20,000 Leagues Under the Sea (1907 film), a French silent film
- 20,000 Leagues Under the Sea (1916 film), a silent film based on the Jules Verne novel
- 20,000 Leagues Under the Sea (1954 film), a Walt Disney film starring Kirk Douglas and James Mason, based on the Jules Verne novel
- 20,000 Leagues Under the Sea (1985 film), an Australian made-for-television animated film
- 20,000 Leagues Under the Sea (1997 film), a 1997 American television film aired by CBS
- 20,000 Leagues Under the Sea (1997 miniseries), a 1997 television miniseries produced in Australia and aired on ABC
- 20,000 Leagues Under the Sea, a 2001 adaptation of the Jules Verne novel by the Radio Tales series for National Public Radio
- 20,000 Leagues Under the Sea, a 2004 animated film produced by DIC that aired on Nickelodeon
- 20,000 Leagues Under the Sea: Submarine Voyage, former attraction at Walt Disney World's Magic Kingdom
- 20,000 Leagues Under the Sea (Tokyo DisneySea), an attraction at Tokyo DisneySea in Japan
- Crayola Kids Adventures: 20,000 Leagues Under the Sea, a 1997 musical adaptation produced by Hallmark Entertainment
