= List of fictional astronauts (futuristic exploration of Moon) =

Lists of fictional astronauts
| Early period | Project Mercury | Project Gemini |
| Project Apollo | 1975–1989 | 1990–1999 |
| 2000–2009 | 2010–2029 | Moon |
| Inner Solar System | Outer Solar System | Other |
Far future

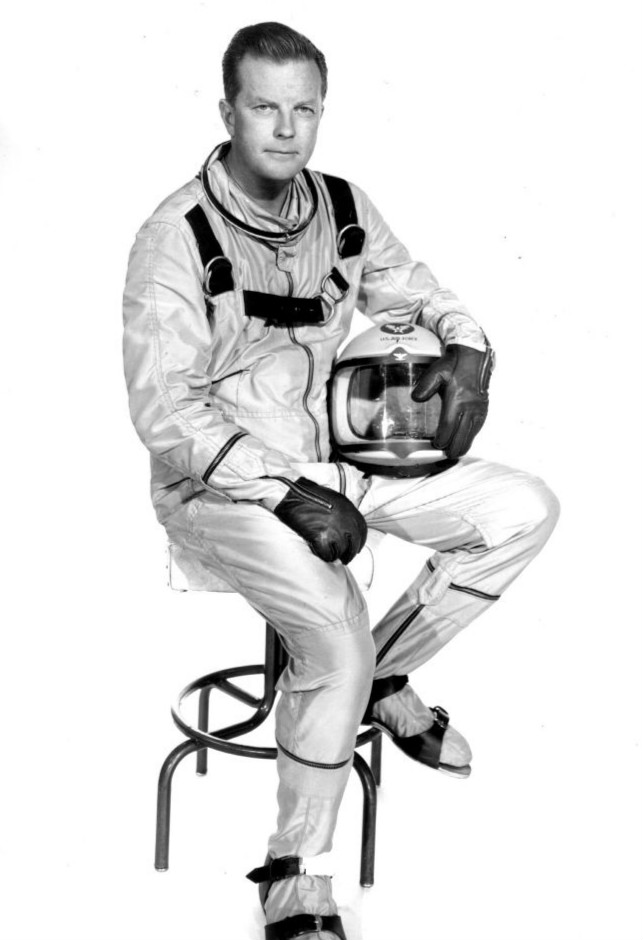
Actor William Lundigan as Col. Edward McCauley, Men into Space (TV series)

The following is a list of fictional astronauts on moonbases and performing other feats of lunar exploration not yet achieved.

== Moon ==
| Name(s) | Appeared in | Program / Mission / Spacecraft | Fictional date |
|---|---|---|---|
| United States: Edward (Note: Called "Mac" by some characters.) McCauley, Col. Joseph Hale, Maj. (Communications Officer); Renza Hale; Billy Williams, Maj. (Navigational Officer); Patrick Donon, Maj. Mason Trett, Maj. Russ Russell, Dr. (Scientist); George Gould, Col. Jeffrey Tuttle, Capt. Kenneth Moresby, Capt. Rick Gordon, Lt. Frank Werner, Lt. Hal Roberts, Capt. Hargaves, Lt. Tom Farrow, Capt. (Radioman); Robbins, Capt. Brugle; Peter Riber, Dr. Fadden; Dan Freer, Capt. (Spacecraft commander); Charles Cooper, Dr. (Biologist); Neil Templeton, Lt. (Navigator); Dobbs, Lt. Pat Warren, Lt. Johnny Baker, Lt. Hardy Stockman, Maj. Markey, Maj. Oliver Farrar, Prof. (Astronomer); Jim Nichols (Astronomer) (Note: Appears in episode "Christmas On the Moon".); Warnecke, Maj. (Dr.) (Physician); Teal, Lt. Adams, Col. Bob Kelly, Lt. Prescott, Dr. (Scientist); David Orrin, Dr. (Scientist); Denny, Lt. Rowland Kennedy, Dr. (Scientist); Doug Bowers, Capt. John Arnold, Maj. Jimmy Manx (Reporter); Paul Carlson (Reporter); Gorman, Lt. Harold Carter, Dr. (Scientist); Perry Holcomb, Dr. (Scientist); Van Fleet, Capt. Narry, Dr. (Mineralogist); Bromfield, Dr. (Scientist); Rice, Dr. (Scientist); Orr, Dr. (Scientist); Stubblefield, Maj. Jim Blythe, Maj. Bernard Bush, Dr. (Scientist); George Coldwell, Dr. (Scientist); Guthrie Durlock, Dr. (Scientist); Walker, Lt. Kyle Rennish, Capt. (Photographer); Rudy Manton, Lt. McIntyre, Maj. Charles Randolph, Maj. John Leonard, Lt. Ingram, Maj. Tom Jackson, Maj. (Spacecraft commander); Henry, Capt. Parker, Dr. (Geologist); Richard Jackson, Capt. Rumbough, Capt. Marlowe, Capt. Webb, Capt. (Radio Operator); Don Miller, Capt. Tim O'Leary, Maj. Frank Bartlett, Col. Tucker, Sgt. Vic Enright, Maj. Others Russia: Tolchek, Col. (Moon base commander); Gulyt, Maj. Kralenko, Maj. (NK-1 commander); Alexandrov, Col. Others | Men into Space (a.k.a. Space Challenge) (1959–60), TV | United States Air Force: Various missions Russia: Moon base NK-1 | c. 1970–1980 |
Future astronauts on Moon missions and Moon base crews.
| Aerobee: Ed McCauley, 1st Lt. Randy (alternate) X-21: Ed McCauley, Maj. (Pilot); Furness, Maj. (Observer) Space Platform: Ed McCauley, Maj. (Commander); Randy Hall, Capt. Sammy Breen, 2nd Lt. Grimaldi Base: Ed McCauley, Col. (Base Commander); Holmes; Kent; Unnamed communications officer 2 other crewmembers Venus ship: Ed McCauley, Col. (Commander); Randy Hall, Maj. (Second-in-Command); Bramwell, Dr. (civilian scientist) First Martian Expedition: Ed McCauley, Col. (Commander); Randy Hall, Maj. (Second-in-Command); Brett; Joe Fallon (impersonating Andrew Fallon) (Mechanic); Hathaway (Meteorologist); Soames | Men into Space (1960), novel | Space Service (United States): Aerobee (suborbital rocket); X-21 (spaceplane); Space Platform; Grimaldi Base (moonbase); Venus ship First Martian Expedition | c. 1960–1980 (Note: Chapter 2 (the X-21 flight) may take place c. 1967, since it refers to Earth orbital satellites "as much as ten years aloft" (p. 30).) |
Tie-in novel based on TV series of same name but featuring original stories. McCauley makes first crewed spaceflight aboard Aerobee and first orbital spaceplane flight in X-21. First Martian Expedition lands on Eros to refuel en route to Mars.
| Rog Everett; Willie Sanger | "Contact" (1960), short short story | Observatory No. 1 | Future |
| Rog Everett; Willie Sanger | Moon-based observers unknowingly witness end of life on Mars. | | |
| Unnamed commander Unnamed astronauts | "Report on the Nature of the Lunar Surface" (1960), short short story | Project Diana: Moonbase One | Near Future |
| Unnamed commander Unnamed astronauts | First astronauts on the Moon discover contamination of lunar surface by earlier uncrewed spacecraft. | | |
| John Anderson, Capt. (Commander) (US); Luis Vargas, Dr. (First Pilot/Communications) (Brazil); Sigrid Bromark, Dr. (Physician/Physicist) (Sweden); Selim Hamid, Dr. (Space Medicine) (Turkey); Erik Heinrich, Dr. (born Hanisch Bernauer) (Rocket designer) (Germany); Hideko Murata, Dr. (Astrophotographer/Pharmacist) (Japan); Asmara Makonnen, Dr. (Chief Navigator/Astronomer) (Nigeria); Etienne Martel, Dr. (Engineer/Technician) (France); Robert "Rod" Murdock, Dr. (Mathematician) (US); Feodor Orloff, Dr. (Geologist/Mapmaker) (USSR); Sir William Rochester, Dr. (Geophysicist) (UK); David Ruskin, Dr. (Aeronautic Engineer/Recorder) (Israel) | 12 to the Moon (1960), film | International Space Order: Lunar Eagle #1; Space taxi | c. 1960s/1970s |
First crewed Moon mission is international project. Anderson made three previous orbital flights.
| Perry Rhodan, Maj. Reginald Bell, Capt. Clark G. Fletcher, Capt. Eric Manoli, Lt. Mike Bull (names from the US-English translation) | Perry Rhodan series (1961–present), novellas, comics, audiobooks, film | Enterprise Stardust | 1971 |
| Perry Rhodan, Maj. Reginald Bell, Capt. Clark G. Fletcher, Capt. Eric Manoli, Lt. Mike Bull (names from the US-English translation) | The astronauts are members of the United States Space Force (USSF) and their mission is the first landing on the Moon – where they find a marooned alien space ship and its crew. | | |
| Wheel Five: Meloni, Capt. (Commander); Vinson, Lt. Reed Kieran (Astrophysicist); Unnamed personnel Ferry: Charles Wandek, Lt. Unnamed astrophysicist (France); Unnamed magnetic field expert Unnamed pump technician | "The Stars, My Brothers" (1962), novella | United Nations Reconnaissance Corps (UNRC): Space Laboratory Number 5 ("Wheel Five"); Ferry | May 1981 |
| Wheel Five: Meloni, Capt. (Commander); Vinson, Lt. Reed Kieran (Astrophysicist); Unnamed personnel Ferry: Charles Wandek, Lt. Unnamed astrophysicist (France); Unnamed magnetic field expert Unnamed pump technician | Kieran, killed in crash of ferry with lunar-orbit space station, is left frozen in space for future revival. | | |
| Three unnamed astronauts (US, UK, USSR) Joseph Cavor; Katherine Callender; Arnold Bedford | First Men in the Moon (1964), film | UN 1 (spacecraft) Cavorite sphere | 1964 Flashback to 1899 |
| Three unnamed astronauts (US, UK, USSR) Joseph Cavor; Katherine Callender; Arnold Bedford | UN crew on Moon discover evidence of 19th-century British lunar expedition. Aged survivor Bedford tells what occurred. | | |
| Luna Station: Sir Ian Macdonald (Director); Gloria Brittain, Dr. (Psychiatrist); Jeff Carter; Crombie, Maj. Bob Howard; Mary; Ottoway, Prof. Avril Simpson (Dietician); Felix Larsen, Prof. (Psychologist/Special agent); Other personnel Royal Commission: Lord Severn; Connor (Accountant); Meeson (Junior Minister); Prentice (Biologist); Watts, Gen. | Moon Base (1964), novel | United Kingdom: Luna Station; Royal Commission | Future |
| Luna Station: Sir Ian Macdonald (Director); Gloria Brittain, Dr. (Psychiatrist); Jeff Carter; Crombie, Maj. Bob Howard; Mary; Ottoway, Prof. Avril Simpson (Dietician); Felix Larsen, Prof. (Psychologist/Special agent); Other personnel Royal Commission: Lord Severn; Connor (Accountant); Meeson (Junior Minister); Prentice (Biologist); Watts, Gen. | Larsen, ostensibly a laser mechanic, travels by rocket to Moon base with investigatory Royal Commission. He is actually a British special agent looking into possible treason at base. | | |
| Lee Stocker, Gen. (Commander); Clint Anderson, Maj. Diana Brice, Prof. Phillip Mendl, Dr. Ernie Travers, Lt. | The Outer Limits; Moonstone (1964), TV | Lunar Expedition One | Near Future |
| Lee Stocker, Gen. (Commander); Clint Anderson, Maj. Diana Brice, Prof. Phillip Mendl, Dr. Ernie Travers, Lt. | Moonbase crew make contact with alien fugitives. | | |
| Gompert (Commander); Dufresne "Yo" Johannsen; Donald Barnard Merriam, Lt. | The Wanderer (1964), novel | U.S. Space Force; Moon Project: Moonbase, U.S. Three rocket ships ("Baba Yagas") | Near Future |
| Gompert (Commander); Dufresne "Yo" Johannsen; Donald Barnard Merriam, Lt. | Astronauts at moonbase in crater Plato when artificial planet emerges from hyperspace into Earth orbit. | | |
| Lavinia Pickerell Cow: Unnamed captain Thurston Williston (Co-pilot/Navigator); Two unnamed crewmembers Lunar Base: M. M. Manborough (Base Commander); Finch, Maj. Foster Esticott, Lt. (Selenodetic survey); Guffey, Dr. (Microbiologist); Rugby (Cafeteria/Supply room); Unnamed Lunar Patrol Officer; Unnamed personnel | Miss Pickerell on the Moon (1965), novel | Space Force (Moon Force): Cargo Spaceship No. 00-41-233 (Cow); Space Force Lunar Base (Moonport); Rocketcraft No. 12-12-22; Mooncraft No. 1 | Near Future |
| Lavinia Pickerell Cow: Unnamed captain Thurston Williston (Co-pilot/Navigator); Two unnamed crewmembers Lunar Base: M. M. Manborough (Base Commander); Finch, Maj. Foster Esticott, Lt. (Selenodetic survey); Guffey, Dr. (Microbiologist); Rugby (Cafeteria/Supply room); Unnamed Lunar Patrol Officer; Unnamed personnel | Miss Pickerell travels to Moon to find antibiotic for animal epidemic. Landing site in Descartes; lunar base in Mare Cognitum. Sequel to Miss Pickerell Goes to Mars (q.v.). | | |
| Pete (no last name given); Unnamed prospector | "Moon Duel" (1965), short story | N/A | Future |
| Pete (no last name given); Unnamed prospector | Prospectors attacked in Gioja crater by alien criminal marooned on Moon. | | |
| Space Station X-7: Frank Cromwell, Col. (Commanding Officer); Andrews, Sgt. (no first name given); Connie Engstrom, Lt. (Communications Officer); Hoffman, Dr. (Physician); Faith Montaine, Dr. (Biochemist); Olsen (no first name given); Unnamed personnel Probe Ship Number 5: Gordon Towers, Maj. Don Webber, Capt. | Mutiny in Outer Space (a.k.a. Invasion From the Moon, Space Station X, Space Station X-14, Invasion to the Moon) (1965), film | United States: Space Station X-7; Probe Ship Number 5 | March 1990 |
| Space Station X-7: Frank Cromwell, Col. (Commanding Officer); Andrews, Sgt. (no first name given); Connie Engstrom, Lt. (Communications Officer); Hoffman, Dr. (Physician); Faith Montaine, Dr. (Biochemist); Olsen (no first name given); Unnamed personnel Probe Ship Number 5: Gordon Towers, Maj. Don Webber, Capt. | Astronauts returning from Moon aboard probe ship inadvertently contaminate space station with fungus from lunar ice caves. | | |
| Link Day (Commander); Mike Capoferri, Dr. Terry Holmes, Dr. (Linguist); Carlos (no last name given); 26 unnamed astronauts | "Wrong Way Street" (1965), short story | United Nations: UN Flight Four | 1989 |
| Link Day (Commander); Mike Capoferri, Dr. Terry Holmes, Dr. (Linguist); Carlos (no last name given); 26 unnamed astronauts | While investigating alien base and spacecraft on Moon, scientist Capoferri accidentally travels back in time. Walnikov is mentioned as the first human on Mars. | | |
| Sirius (USAF): Davis; Acton (Last names not given) Space Station One: 'Santa Fe' : Felix Coulter, Dr. (Director); Unnamed US astronauts Little Bear: Melvin K. Green (V-POTUS) | Hunter-Killer (1966), novel | Sirius Space Station One: Santa Fe Little Bear | Alternate 1970s |
| Sirius (USAF): Davis; Acton (Last names not given) Space Station One: 'Santa Fe' : Felix Coulter, Dr. (Director); Unnamed US astronauts Little Bear: Melvin K. Green (V-POTUS) | After the Air Force sends two men to the Moon but fails to bring them back safely, the Navy decides to upstage them by sending the Vice-President into orbit using an uprated Polaris missile. | | |
| Schmidlap (US) (Weathernaut); Hoffman (US) (Weathernaut); Peter Mattemore (US); Eileen Forbes (US) (Astronomer) Igor Valkleinokov (USSR); Anna Soblova (USSR) | Way...Way Out (1966), film | Unknown | 1994 |
| Schmidlap (US) (Weathernaut); Hoffman (US) (Weathernaut); Peter Mattemore (US); Eileen Forbes (US) (Astronomer) Igor Valkleinokov (USSR); Anna Soblova (USSR) | US sends a married couple to live on the Moon and operate a weather station close to a nearby Soviet lunar base. Couples have a space race to see who will have the first "Moon baby". | | |
| Project Settlement: Perkins, Cmdr. Unnamed crew Project Rescue: Steve (no last name given); Unnamed crew | Night Gallery; The Nature of the Enemy (1970), TV | U.S. Department of Space: Project Settlement; Project Rescue | Near Future |
| Project Settlement: Perkins, Cmdr. Unnamed crew Project Rescue: Steve (no last name given); Unnamed crew | Astronaut on rescue mission discovers giant mousetrap on the Moon. | | |
| Clarence "Clancy" Ballou; Jack; Roger (no last names given for last two) | "Now I'm Watching Roger" (1972), short story | Unknown | Future |
| Clarence "Clancy" Ballou; Jack; Roger (no last names given for last two) | Interpersonal tensions among astronauts on moonbase. | | |
| Siren II: Stan Bailey (Note: Described as an "Astronautical test engineer") Miroslava Space Detachment: (Note: Part of the Soviet Space Squadron.); Natasha; Olga; Lyudmilla; Tanya; Unnamed female cosmonauts Two unnamed male cosmonauts | The Moonlovers: An Erotic Space Odyssey (1975), novel | Unknown; Siren II Soviet Lunar Colony | Near future (Note: Main character states the events related in the book begin on January 16, 1978.) |
| Siren II: Stan Bailey Miroslava Space Detachment: Natasha; Olga; Lyudmilla; Tanya; Unnamed female cosmonauts Two unnamed male cosmonauts | NASA astronaut whose long-duration Earth orbital mission is suddenly endangered when a mysterious force pulls his spacecraft towards the Moon. The ending hints that the story may be a dream. | | |
| Moonbase Sinus Medii; Ed Speedwell, Capt (Commander); Ivan Flyenov, Capt (2nd in Command); Jerry Owyee, Lt (3rd in Command); Rocky Rhodes, Lt. Harold Cummings, Dr. Irene Stone, Dr. Lois White, Dr. Mike O'Riley; Unnamed astronauts Moon Orbiting Space Station 1 Six unnamed astronauts Moon Orbiting Space Station 2 Yuri Chisodva, Capt. Five unnamed astronauts Aristotle; Dick Peterson, Capt. Unnamed astronauts Agamemnon; Ed Speedwell, Capt. Jean Chelsea-Smith, Lt. (RAF); Peter Chorosous | Class G-Zero (1976?), novel | Moonbase; Sinus Medii Space Station; Skylab V Moon Orbiting Space Station 1 Moon Orbiting Space Station 2 Space Shuttles: Orbiter 8 Orbiter 10 Nuclear Lunar Shuttles: Aristotle; Agamemnon | Near Future (Alternate 1990s?) |
| Moonbase Sinus Medii; Ed Speedwell, Capt (Commander); Ivan Flyenov, Capt (2nd in Command); Jerry Owyee, Lt (3rd in Command); Rocky Rhodes, Lt. Harold Cummings, Dr. Irene Stone, Dr. Lois White, Dr. Mike O'Riley; Unnamed astronauts Moon Orbiting Space Station 1 Six unnamed astronauts Moon Orbiting Space Station 2 Yuri Chisodva, Capt. Five unnamed astronauts Aristotle; Dick Peterson, Capt. Unnamed astronauts Agamemnon; Ed Speedwell, Capt. Jean Chelsea-Smith, Lt. (RAF); Peter Chorosous | Astronauts of the International Space Agency (ISA) who find themselves dealing with a first contact situation. | | |
| Unnamed astronaut | Challenge of the Superfriends; The World's Deadliest Game (1978), TV | Spaceplane 16; Space station | Contemporary/Near Future |
| Unnamed astronaut | Wonder Woman, Hawkman and Black Vulcan assist spacewalking astronaut with repairs of space station in lunar orbit. | | |
| NASA: Douglas Cummings; Don Wayne Wehrmacht: Franz Bethwig | Vengeance 10 (1980), novel | Unknown V-10 | May 6, 2009, flashback to 1938–45 |
| NASA: Douglas Cummings; Don Wayne Wehrmacht: Franz Bethwig | Two American astronauts stumble across the final remnants of Nazi Germany's Moon Program. | | |
| Malcolm Tanner, Col. (Station Commandant/Geophysicist); Joel Gilfillan; Unnamed personnel | "It Isn't Love That Makes the World Go 'Round" (1981), short story | United States: Moon Station | c. 1996 (November) |
| Malcolm Tanner, Col. (Station Commandant/Geophysicist); Joel Gilfillan; Unnamed personnel | Five days before closure of Moon Station, Tanner and Gilfillan make incredible discovery in Lubinicky A. | | |
| Douglas Morgan; Lisa Morgan; Fred Simpson; Martin Kobol; William Demain; Catherine Demain; Larry LaStrande; Sylvia Dortman; Blair; Marrett; Haley (First names not given for the last three) Other unnamed astronauts | Test of Fire (1982), novel | Unknown Space Station Space Shuttle | Near Future |
| Douglas Morgan; Lisa Morgan; Fred Simpson; Martin Kobol; William Demain; Catherine Demain; Larry LaStrande; Sylvia Dortman; Blair; Marrett; Haley (First names not given for the last three) Other unnamed astronauts | Personnel at a moonbase in the crater Alphonsus which becomes the last outpost of civilization when the Earth is devastated by a massive solar flare and the nuclear strikes it triggers. Revision of When the Sky Burned (1972). | | |
| US Jersey Colony; Eli Steinmetz; Willie Shea; Kurt Perry, Dr. Dawson (First name not given); Gallagher (First name not given); Cooper (First name not given); Snyder (First name not given); Russell (First name not given); Two unnamed astronauts Columbus; Jack Sherman, Cmdr. Unnamed astronauts Gettysberg; Dave Jurgens, Cmdr. Carl Burkhart, Co-Pilot; Unnamed Mission Specialists USSR Selenos 4 Three unnamed cosmonauts Selenos 5 Three unnamed cosmonauts Selenos 6 Three unnamed cosmonauts Selenos 8 (FKA); Two unnamed cosmonauts (Soviet Army); Grigory Leuchenko, Maj. Dmitry Petrov, Lt. Ivan Ostrovski, Sgt. Mikhail Yuschuk, Cpl. Unnamed corporal | Cyclops (1986), novel | Cosmos Luna; Selenos 4–6 & 8 Moonbase; Jersey Colony Space Station; Columbus Space Shuttle; Gettysberg | Near Future |
The actions of members of an illegal lunar colony cause a crisis between the United States and the Soviet Union. Mention is made in the novel of Salyuts 9 and 10.
| Wolfgang "Wolfli" Hitler (born Wolfgang Tshurkurka) | "Reichs-Peace" (1986), short story | Nazi Germany: Mondexpedition | 1980s (Alternate History) |
| Wolfgang "Wolfli" Hitler (born Wolfgang Tshurkurka) | Adolf Hitler's adopted Romany son is endangered by sunspot activity while away from Moon base. | | |
| Andy; Phil Molly Brown: Kathy (Commander); Peter (Ph.D.) (Science officer) (No last names given) | Space Station Friendship: A Visit with the Crew in 2007 (1988), novel | Project Willow Stick: Molly Brown (Orbital transfer vehicle [OTV]) | 2007 (Autumn) |
| Andy; Phil Molly Brown: Kathy (Commander); Peter (Ph.D.) (Science officer) (No last names given) | NASA astronauts exploring Scott Crater. Kathy and Peter are husband and wife. | | |
| SPACECORE 1: Flynn Harding (Captain); Giles Stewart, Lt. (Co-pilot); Paxton Warner (Science officer); Philip Jennings (Chief engineer); Alex McInny (Operations officer); Dreyfuss Steiner (Physician) Discovery: Blake Schadwell, Capt. William T. Marks, Lt. Col. Michael C. Gotier, Lt. (Note: Rank given as Lieutenant in dialogue, but as Captain in onscreen display.) Tiberius: Lewis Ramser [sp?] (Captain) | The Dark Side of the Moon (a.k.a. Spacecore, Something is Waiting) (1990), film | SPACECORE 1 (maintenance ship) Space Shuttle; Discovery 18 Tiberius | 2022 |
| SPACECORE 1: Flynn Harding (Captain); Giles Stewart, Lt. (Co-pilot); Paxton Warner (Science officer); Philip Jennings (Chief engineer); Alex McInny (Operations officer); Dreyfuss Steiner (Physician) Discovery: Blake Schadwell, Capt. William T. Marks, Lt. Col. Michael C. Gotier, Lt. Tiberius: Lewis Ramser [sp?] (Captain) | 30 years after NASA ceases operations, crew on mission to repair nuclear weapons satellites finds derelict Space Shuttle, which disappeared after 1992 emergency splashdown in Bermuda Triangle, in lunar orbit. | | |
| Europa: Silvia Rabal (Spain) (Pilot); Marco Albertosi (Italy) Landing module: Marte Schierbeck (Denmark) (Module pilot); Dieter Kaufmann (Germany); Emile Lemarque (France); Kevin O'Meara (Air Force) (Ireland); Adriaan van der Heyde (Netherlands) Giuseppe Serena (Italy) (Alternate) Lunar Village: Unnamed Commander (Astrophysicist); Ed Druson, Col. (Head of Security); Unnamed pod pilot Unnamed personnel Lunar shuttle: Peter Pascoe (UK Commissioner, Eurofed Justice Department); Andrew Dalziel (Detective Superintendent, ret.) | One Small Step (1990), novella | Federated States of Europe; Federal Space Programme: Europa; Landing module United States: Lunar Village; Lunar shuttle | May 2010 (Note: Year incorrectly given as "2012" on jacket flap of Asking for the Moon.) |
At the moment he becomes the first European on the lunar surface, Lemarque is killed by short circuit in his urine collection device; Dalziel and Pascoe investigate. European landing on May 14, 2010.
| LFSVLFA: John Clay, Dr. (Project manager/Astronomer); Edward (Computer engineer); Jennifer; Zheng (China) (no last names given) Yuegong Base: Port Director (unnamed); Unnamed administrative assistant Unnamed doctor Cantu (Moonhopper pilot); Sylvester "Rod" Rodriguez (Mechanic); Unnamed nurse Unnamed personnel L-5 Station: Ramona (Senior technician) | "The Listening Glass" (1991), short story | Lunar Far-Side Very Low Frequency Array (LFSVLFA) Yuegong Base L-5 Station | 2019 |
| LFSVLFA: John Clay, Dr. (Project manager/Astronomer); Edward (Computer engineer); Jennifer; Zheng (China) (no last names given) Yuegong Base: Port Director (unnamed); Unnamed administrative assistant Unnamed doctor Cantu (Moonhopper pilot); Sylvester "Rod" Rodriguez (Mechanic); Unnamed nurse Unnamed personnel L-5 Station: Ramona (Senior technician) | Project manager Clay falls from radio telescope antenna on lunar farside, seriously damaging telescope. Ramona, his wife, is working on space station at Earth-Moon Lagrange Point Five. Telescope located in Bolton crater on edge of Sanduleak walled plain, on rim of Schrödinger. Yuegong Base located in Hadley–Apennine region. | | |
| Moonshadow: Patricia Jay "Trish" Mulligan; Sanjiv; Theresa (no last names given) Rescuer: Stanley (Mission Commander) (no first name given); Tanya Nakora | "A Walk in the Sun" (1991), short story | Moonshadow; Rescuer | Future |
| Moonshadow: Patricia Jay "Trish" Mulligan; Sanjiv; Theresa (no last names given) Rescuer: Stanley (Mission Commander) (no first name given); Tanya Nakora | After Moonshadow crash-lands during Moon orbit mission, sole survivor Mulligan walks all the way around the Moon to remain in sunlight while awaiting rescue. Crash site near edge of Mare Smythii. | | |
| Two unnamed astronauts | Kyoryu Sentai Zyuranger; Birth (1992), TV (adapted as Mighty Morphin Power Rangers; Day of the Dumpster (1993), TV) | Space Shuttle | Contemporary |
| Two unnamed astronauts | Astronauts accidentally release sorceress Witch Bandora (Rita Repulsa in American version) from 10,000-year imprisonment on Moon. (Note: Although supposedly Earth's Moon, the planet has an atmosphere and an extra planet in the sky.) | | |
| Dmitri (no last name given) | Dmitri the Astronaut (1996), picture book | Unknown (United States) | Contemporary/Near Future (October – Thanksgiving) |
| Dmitri (no last name given) | Astronaut returns to Earth after two and a half years on the Moon to find that no one remembers him. | | |
| Chris Terence, Dr. (USA) (Commander); Xiao Be (China) (Pilot); Peter Mikhailovich Denisov (Russia) (Engineer); Jiang Wu (China) | Encounter with Tiber (1996), novel | Tiber Two; Tiber Prize (modified Apollo IIs) | 2010 |
| Chris Terence, Dr. (USA) (Commander); Xiao Be (China) (Pilot); Peter Mikhailovich Denisov (Russia) (Engineer); Jiang Wu (China) | Mission to retrieve alien technology from lunar south pole ends in tragedy. | | |
| Constitution: Edward A. Graham, Jr., Cmdr. (Co-Pilot); Casey Hamilton, Lt. (Flight Engineer); Kenneth A. Moore, Lt. (Flight Mechanic); Richard Dunning, Sgt. (Mission Specialist); Walter Kahn, Dr. (Flight Surgeon) Space Station One: Chet Aldridge, Gen. (USSF) (Commander); Tom Sidwell Luna Two: Eugene M. Parnell (Commander); Joseph K. Laughlin; Eight unnamed astronauts Sanger XS-1: Karl Schiller, Col. (West Germany) Constellation: P. A. Kingsolver, Capt. (Pilot); H. M. Trombly, Lt. Cmdr. (Co-Pilot) Conestoga: Gene Parnell, Cmdr. (Commander); Cristine September "Cris" Ryer, Capt. (USAF) (Pilot); Jay Lewitt, Lt. (Flight Engineer); Cecil Orvitz (impersonating Paul Aaron Dooley) (Computer programmer); Berkley Rhodes (Reporter); Alex Bromleigh (Cameraman/Producer) Koenig Selenen GmbH: James Patrick "Pat" Leamore (Executive Vice-President); Uwe Aachener (Astronaut-Candidate); Markus Talsbach (Astronaut-Candidate) Harpers Ferry: Curtis "Dr. Z" Zimm (Pilot) Space Station One: Joseph K. "Old Joe" Laughlin, Cdre. (USN) (Commander); Frierson, Lt. j.g. (NASA); Hollis, Lt. (NASA); Unnamed personnel Fido's Pride: Edmund "Poppa Dog" McGraw (Pilot); Billy Zenith-Two: Unnamed astronauts | The Tranquillity Alternative (1996), novel | United States Air Force: U.S.S. Constitution (space ferry) United States Space Force (USSF): Space Station One ("the Wheel") Luna Two (Eagle Four lander) ESA: Sanger XS-1 (spaceplane) NASA: Constellation (Atlas-C space ferry); Space Station One; U.S.S. Conestoga (Moonship); Harpers Ferry (space taxi); Fido's Pride (Mars Retriever 13); Tranquillity Base/Teal Falcon bunker ESA: Walter Dornberger (Sanger booster/Horus-class orbiter) North Korea: Zenith-Two (Ghost Rider) | April 10, 1956 (Alternate History) 1963–1966 (Alternate History) September 1969 (Alternate History) 1977 (Alternate History) February 16–22, 1995 (Alternate History) |
In alternate history, NASA launches final Moon mission in 1995 to turn over Tranquillity Base to German company. First crewed space ferry flight in 1956 commanded by Chuck Yeager. Joint US-Soviet Ares One mission lands on Mars in July 1976 with Neil Armstrong and Alexei Leonov. (Note: According to "Goddard's People", Ares One landing site is in Utopia Planitia.) Set in same alternate history as Steele's short stories "Goddard's People" and "John Harper Wilson" and novel V-S Day (q.v.).
| HayesCorp Moonship: Ishmael Hayes; Elisabeth (no last name given); Bennett (Security) (no first name given) Subtropolis: Sam Houston (Subtropolis Systems); Jimmy; Stevie G. (Foreman); Gene; Tobol; Aggie; Bob Hennessey; Betsy Warren; MacPherson; Unnamed personnel Channel Seven: Dave Archer (Reporter); Annie "Sparky" Franklin (Segment producer); Heck Allen (Cameraman) | Astronauts in Trouble: Live from the Moon (1999), Astronauts in Trouble: One Shot, One Beer (2000), graphic novels | HayesCorp: Moonship; Cargo One; Cargo Two; Cargo Three; Subtropolis (moonbase) Channel Seven: Newsvan | 2019 |
| HayesCorp Moonship: Ishmael Hayes; Elisabeth (no last name given); Bennett (Security) (no first name given) Subtropolis: Sam Houston (Subtropolis Systems); Jimmy; Stevie G. (Foreman); Gene; Tobol; Aggie; Bob Hennessey; Betsy Warren; MacPherson; Unnamed personnel Channel Seven: Dave Archer (Reporter); Annie "Sparky" Franklin (Segment producer); Heck Allen (Cameraman) | Channel Seven reporters report on HayesCorp returning humans to the moon, only to discover that billionaire Hayes has had a secret moonbase in the Sea of Showers for five years. Hayes' moonship lands north of Cassini Crater; Newsvan lands south of Autolycus. | | |
| NASA: John Lakey (Chief of Astronaut Office); Deborah Kimbrough; Jay Guidon (CAPCOM); Molly Peterson (CAPCOM) Nazarbeyev (Kazakhstan) (no first name given) Original STS-128 crew/ Endeavour crew: Olivia "Ollie" Grant, Col. (Ph.D.) (Commander); Tanya Brown (Pilot); Betsy Newell (Mission Specialist 1); Janet Barnes (Mission Specialist 2); Penny High Eagle (born Penelope Ingle), Ph.D. (Payload Specialist) (joins hijack crew) Hijack crew (MEC): Jack Medaris; Craig "Hopalong" Cassidy, Capt. (Pilot); Virgil "Virg" Judd (Shuttle Main Engine Technician) Soyuz-Y: Olivia Grant; Yuri Dubrinski, Col. (RSA) (pilot) | Back to the Moon (1999), novel | NASA: Space Shuttles; Columbia (STS-128); Endeavour Russian Space Agency: Soyuz-Y Medaris Engineering Company (MEC): Elsie; Elsie-2 (Landing Craft) | c. 2002 (July) |
On its last scheduled mission, shuttle Columbia is hijacked and flown to the Moon by former NASA engineer Medaris. Cassidy is an ex-NASA astronaut who flew on all the shuttles and Mir, helped repair the Hubble Space Telescope, and commanded Spacelab XXI. Nazarbeyev was a guest cosmonaut on Mir. Moon landing near Apollo 17 landing site in Taurus-Littrow.
| Collins (FS-6); Po Tseng, Col. Jerry Cochagne; Joe DeSosa; Dick Lebby; Arminta Horo; Paul Manch; Iona Greer Aldrin/Farside Base (FS-5); Mike Mobley, Col. Louise Washington; Ann Biso; Bob Faden; Frank Dryzmkowski; Shinobu Takizawa | Blood Moon (1999), novel | Lunar Landing Modules; Aldrin; Collins Moonbase; Farside | Near Future |
| Collins (FS-6); Po Tseng, Col. Jerry Cochagne; Joe DeSosa; Dick Lebby; Arminta Horo; Paul Manch; Iona Greer Aldrin/Farside Base (FS-5); Mike Mobley, Col. Louise Washington; Ann Biso; Bob Faden; Frank Dryzmkowski; Shinobu Takizawa | When contact is unexpectedly lost with the first astronauts to spend a full lunar day/cycle a rescue mission is hastily launched. | | |
| Michelle "Mickey" Griffith, Col. (Ph.D.) (USAF) (Commander) | Astronaut (2003), play | NASA: Lunar Colony One | Near Future |
| Michelle "Mickey" Griffith, Col. (Ph.D.) (USAF) (Commander) | Commander of lunar colony at edge of Procellarum Ocean (near 18°N 75°W) gives press conference. | | |
| Rachel Fine, Maj. Ben Halberstom, Capt. John Redding (Mission Specialist) | Earthstorm (2006), TV movie | American Space Institute (ASI): Space Shuttle; Perseus (Lunar Mission) | Contemporary/Near Future |
| Rachel Fine, Maj. Ben Halberstom, Capt. John Redding (Mission Specialist) | Demolition expert Redding joins mission to stabilize Moon after asteroid impact. Perseus has experimental nuclear pulse engines. | | |
| Stallman: T.J. Bianco, Col. (Commander); Zen, Ph.D. (New Zealand) (Lead engineer); Penguin (Systems engineer) Cutter Industries Team: Austen Cutter (Commander); Steven Frazier (Second in command); Dave Caldridge (USN) (Ph.D.) (Lead engineer) | "Openshot" (2006), short story | Openshot: Stallman (Command Module/Lunar Landing Module [LLM]) Cutter Industries Team: Command Module/Landing Module | Near Future |
| Stallman: T.J. Bianco, Col. (Commander); Zen, Ph.D. (New Zealand) (Lead engineer); Penguin (Systems engineer) Cutter Industries Team: Austen Cutter (Commander); Steven Frazier (Second in command); Dave Caldridge (USN) (Ph.D.) (Lead engineer) | Crews participating in International Lunar Peace Race, a $100 million prize competition for first non-governmental crewed Moon landing. Openshot is an opensource engineering project. Stallman command module is a surplus Russian module from canceled second phase of Space Station Freedom. Bianco is a former USAF and NASA pilot who lost her lower legs after a crash landing. | | |
| Deke Gordon, Capt. PASE: Rachel Salerno, Cmdr. Hatcher (no first name given) | Poptropica; Lunar Colony (2007–2013), online game and chapter book | Poptropica Academy of Space Exploration (PASE): Lunar colony Flight capsule Lunar lander | Future |
| Deke Gordon, Capt. PASE: Rachel Salerno, Cmdr. Hatcher (no first name given) | Alien artifacts are found near lunar colony. Gordon built first lunar facility decades earlier. | | |
| Lloyd Nadolski, Capt. (Commander); Caitlin Hall, Lt. (LMP); Aldrich Coleman, Capt. (Habitat Commander); Samuel Wilson (Space Engineer); Peter D. Stanton (Space Engineer); Mia Nomeland (Norway); Midori Yoshida (Japan); Antoine Devereux (France) | Darlah – 172 timer på månen (a.k.a. 172 Hours on the Moon) (2008), novel | NASA Ceres (Command Module), Demeter (Lunar Module) Moonbase; DARLAH 2 | April 2018 – July 2019 |
| Lloyd Nadolski, Capt. (Commander); Caitlin Hall, Lt. (LMP); Aldrich Coleman, Capt. (Habitat Commander); Samuel Wilson (Space Engineer); Peter D. Stanton (Space Engineer); Mia Nomeland (Norway); Midori Yoshida (Japan); Antoine Devereux (France) | Teenagers Mia, Midori and Antoine win lottery to visit top-secret lunar base built in the 1970s in the Sea of Tranquility. | | |
| André Gretzsin Mare Serenitatis base: André Gretzsin, Jr. (Commander); Frank (no last name given); Rachel (no last name given); Unnamed personnel Farside Station: Matt Tanager (Captain); Unnamed personnel | "Letting Go" (2008), short story | Unnamed moonbase (Mare Serenitatis); Farside Base; Gravity Train (Capsule A) | Future (21st century) |
| André Gretzsin Mare Serenitatis base: André Gretzsin, Jr. (Commander); Frank (no last name given); Rachel (no last name given); Unnamed personnel Farside Station: Matt Tanager (Captain); Unnamed personnel | Gravity train is built linking Mare Serenitatis and Farside Base through lunar core. Frank previously flew on ISS. André Gretzsin, Jr.'s grandfather flew on Mir; his father was an astronaut killed in a training accident. | | |
| Fort Discovery: Virginia Rickles, Sgt. Sangre de Christo: Matteo (Mission leader); Lourdes; Unnamed political officer Unnamed communications officer | "The Economy of Vacuum" (2009), short story | NASA: Fort Discovery (moonbase) Guatemala: BRSCG Sangre de Christo; Landing shuttle | Future (21st century) |
| Fort Discovery: Virginia Rickles, Sgt. Sangre de Christo: Matteo (Mission leader); Lourdes; Unnamed political officer Unnamed communications officer | Rickles is stranded on moonbase when world is devastated by nuclear war. Thirty-one years later, Sangre de Christo crew discovers her still living on Moon. | | |
| Sam Bell | Moon (2009), film | Sarang mining base | 2035 |
| Sam Bell | Astronaut tending an automated mining facility on the Moon's far side. (Note: Sam Bell reappears in Mute (2018).) | | |
| Vision Enterprises: Astro Spalding (Pilot) (Note: Not explicitly stated to be an astronaut.) RRSS: Yuri (no last name given) | Space Buddies (2009), film | Vision Enterprises: Vision One (V-1) (Single-stage-to-orbit spaceplane) Russian Space Agency: Russian Research Space Station (RRSS); Cosmopod escape vessel | Contemporary |
| Vision Enterprises: Astro Spalding (Pilot) RRSS: Yuri (no last name given) | American company launches uncrewed test of lunar passenger spacecraft, which refuels at Russian station in Earth orbit due to emergency. | | |
| China National Space Agency: Gong Zheng Harmony: Hui Tian (Commander); Ming Feng (Pilot); Xu Guan, Dr. (Physician); Zhi Feng (Engineer/Political Officer) NASA: Charles Leonard (Pilot); Helen Menendez (Mission Specialist); Jim England Mercy I: Bill Stetson (Commander/Pilot); Anthony Chow, M.D., Ph.D. (Mission Specialist) Dreamscape: Paul Gesling, Capt. (Commander/Pilot); Passengers: Matt Thibodeau; Maquita Singer; Sharik Mbanta; Bridget Wells; John Graves, Dr. | Back to the Moon (2010), novel | China National Space Agency: Harmony Space Excursions: Dreamscape (spaceplane) NASA (Constellation Program): Mercy I (Orion/Altair) | 2020s (August) |
| China National Space Agency: Gong Zheng Harmony: Hui Tian (Commander); Ming Feng (Pilot); Xu Guan, Dr. (Physician); Zhi Feng (Engineer/Political Officer) NASA: Charles Leonard (Pilot); Helen Menendez (Mission Specialist); Jim England Mercy I: Bill Stetson (Commander/Pilot); Anthony Chow, M.D., Ph.D. (Mission Specialist) Dreamscape: Paul Gesling, Capt. (Commander/Pilot); Passengers: Matt Thibodeau; Maquita Singer; Sharik Mbanta; Bridget Wells; John Graves, Dr. | On commercial circumlunar flight, Dreamscape picks up distress call from crashed Chinese lander Harmony on lunar service. NASA reconfigures planned Moon landing as rescue mission. Leonard and Menendez are assigned to Moon landing before crew is cut back to allow taikonauts to be rescued. | | |
| Marcia Beckett (US) (Commander); Yuri Petrov (Russia); Three unnamed NASA astronauts One unnamed Russian cosmonaut | "The Cassandra Project" (2010), short story | Minerva | 2026 |
| Marcia Beckett (US) (Commander); Yuri Petrov (Russia); Three unnamed NASA astronauts One unnamed Russian cosmonaut | Joint US-Russian mission, first crewed Moon landing since Apollo 17. Landing in Mare Maskelyne. Mission omitted in 2012 novel adaptation. Sid Myshko named as commander of earlier orbital mission. | | |
| Base Diana: Cliff Devenish, Col. (Commander); Andrea "Andi" Carlisle, Maj. Jim Reeve, Capt. Marty Garrett, Capt. (Technical Officer); Dyson, Pvt. Downham (Soldier); Unnamed soldiers Charles Jackson, Prof. (Head scientist); Liz Didbrook (Assistant scientist); Lars Gregman (Scientist); Phillips (Nurse); Unnamed scientists Apollo 23: Pat Ashton, Lt. (CMP); Marty Garrett, Capt. | Doctor Who; Apollo 23 (2010), novel | United States: Base Diana Apollo 23; Unnamed CSM/LM | Contemporary |
| Base Diana: Cliff Devenish, Col. (Commander); Andrea "Andi" Carlisle, Maj. Jim Reeve, Capt. Marty Garrett, Capt. (Technical Officer); Dyson, Pvt. Downham (Soldier); Unnamed soldiers Charles Jackson, Prof. (Head scientist); Liz Didbrook (Assistant scientist); Lars Gregman (Scientist); Phillips (Nurse); Unnamed scientists Apollo 23: Pat Ashton, Lt. (CMP); Marty Garrett, Capt. | Secret moonbase is infiltrated by alien force and cut off from Earth by sabotage of "quantum displacement" equipment. Ashton and Garrett are space shuttle veterans. | | |
| NASA: Joe Santalupo (Chief Astronaut) Artemis 3: Gary Hobbs; Scott Stevenson; James "Jim" Truax, Cmdr. (Ph.D.) (USN) | "Drag Queen Astronaut" (2010), short story | Artemis 3 | Near Future |
| NASA: Joe Santalupo (Chief Astronaut) Artemis 3: Gary Hobbs; Scott Stevenson; James "Jim" Truax, Cmdr. (Ph.D.) (USN) | During mission to Fra Mauro to investigate buried alien spacecraft, Truax is caught on camera wearing female undergarments in lunar orbit. | | |
| Glorious March: Ten unnamed astronauts Magnificent Dragon: Kwan Xiang, Maj. Gen. (Commander); Chao, Sgt. Ten unnamed soldiers (Chinese Air Force / Chinese Special Forces) Ariane 1 (ESA Moon Mission 01): Jean Marceau, Maj. (Commander); Unnamed pilot Unnamed copilot Three unnamed mission specialists Philippe Jarneux, Capt. (Commandos Marine); Unnamed sergeant (Commandos Marine); Two unnamed commandos (Commandos Marine) Ariane 2: Ten unnamed astronauts NASA: Harwell, Capt. Dark Star 1: Unnamed shuttle commander and pilot Ten unnamed astronauts Dark Star 2: Unnamed shuttle commander and pilot Ten unnamed astronauts Dark Star 3: Johnson (shuttle commander); Walker (shuttle pilot); Arthur Kendal, Col. (USAF) (Mission commander); Maggio (Command module pilot); Dugan, Lt. (USN) (Lunar lander pilot); Jason Ryan, Lt. (USN/Event Group) (Lunar lander copilot/mission specialist); Sarah McIntire, Lt. (US Army/Event Group) (Mission specialist); Will Mendenhall, 2nd Lt. (Event Group) (Mission specialist); Andrews, Sgt. (5th Special Forces Group); Demarest, Sgt. (5th Special Forces Group); Elliott (5th Special Forces Group); Johnson (5th Special Forces Group); Martinez, Sgt. (5th Special Forces Group); Stanley Sampson, Sgt. (5th Special Forces Group); Tewlewiski, Sgt. (5th Special Forces Group) Peter the Great: Unnamed cosmonauts | Legacy (2011), novel | China National Space Administration; Chinese Lunar Exploration Program: Glorious March (Long March 8 / Zihuang lunar lander); Magnificent Dragon (Long March 8 / Zihuang lunar lander) European Space Agency: ESA Moon Mission 01 (launched by Ariane 5 1): Bonaparte 1 (command module); Astral (lunar lander) Ariane 5 2 International Space Station NASA/DARPA; Operation Dark Star: Dark Star 1: Space Shuttle; Discovery; Modified Orion (unnamed) / Modified Altair (Achilles 1) Dark Star 2: Space Shuttle; Endeavour; Modified Orion (unnamed) / Modified Altair (Thor 1) Dark Star 3: Space Shuttle; Atlantis; Modified Orion (Falcon 1) / Modified Altair (Yorktown) Russian Federal Space Agency: Peter the Great (lunar lander) | Contemporary |
Nations race to recover alien weaponry and energy-producing mineral discovered in Shackleton Crater by robotic NASA rovers. Dark Star 1 command module and lander are launched by Ares I, Dark Star 2 command module and lander by Ares V, Dark Star 3 command module and lander by Atlas V (Note: Referred to as both "Atlas V" and "Saturn V" throughout the book (cf. p. 241).) left over from Apollo program. Glorious March, Ariane 2, Discovery and Endeavour are destroyed after launch by ASM-135 ASATs and SA-2 Guidelines.
| Henry Watkins, Jr. | American Dad! National Treasure 4: Baby Franny: She's Doing Well: The Hole Story (2012), TV | Unknown | Contemporary |
| Henry Watkins, Jr. | Astronaut building space station on Moon. | | |
| Morgan "Bucky" Blackstone; Ben Gaines (Pilot); Marcia Neimark; Phil Bassinger | The Cassandra Project (2012), novel | Blackstone Enterprises; Sidney Myshko | 2019 |
| Morgan "Bucky" Blackstone; Ben Gaines (Pilot); Marcia Neimark; Phil Bassinger | First private crewed mission to Moon. Neimark and Bassinger make landing in Cassegrain Crater. | | |
| Liberty: "Sand" Sanders; James Washington (Model) George W. Bush: Vivian Wagner (Commander); McLennan (Officer); Tynan; Unnamed personnel Nazi moonbase: Wolfgang Kortzfleisch (Mondführer); Klaus Adler (Oberführer, later Führer); Richter, Dr. (Scientist); Renate Richter (Earthologist); Weapons NCO (unnamed); Unnamed personnel | Iron Sky (2012), film | United States: "Liberty" (Moon Mission); U.S.S. George W. Bush (Mars exploration ship) Nazi Germany: Moonbase; First Fleet: Götterdämmerung (battleship); Siegfried (battleship); Tannhäuser (battleship); Heinrich (battleship); Biterolf (battleship); Wolfram (battleship); Valkyries (spacecraft) International Space Station (European Union) Australia: Australian Ship Dundee 01 UK: Spitfire Russia: Mir Canada; Japan; India; South Korea | 2018 |
| Liberty: "Sand" Sanders; James Washington (Model) George W. Bush: Vivian Wagner (Commander); McLennan (Officer); Tynan; Unnamed personnel Nazi moonbase: Wolfgang Kortzfleisch (Mondführer); Klaus Adler (Oberführer, later Führer); Richter, Dr. (Scientist); Renate Richter (Earthologist); Weapons NCO (unnamed); Unnamed personnel | American astronauts discover Nazi moonbase. | | |
| George Gompers (Commander); Tom Conrad, Lt. Cmdr. (USAF) (Pilot); Fred Phillips, Lt. (Engineer); Maxon Mann, Dr. (Roboticist) | Shine Shine Shine (2012), novel | NASA: Aeneid rocket | Contemporary/Near Future |
| George Gompers (Commander); Tom Conrad, Lt. Cmdr. (USAF) (Pilot); Fred Phillips, Lt. (Engineer); Maxon Mann, Dr. (Roboticist) | NASA astronauts on mission to colonize the Moon with robots. | | |
| CES-51: Freddie Saturn (NASA); Buddy Waters (NASA); Damien Kweller (NASA); Karen Jones (NASA); Linda Cliff (NASA); Hibito Nanba (JAXA) | Space Brothers (2012), anime (based on the 2007 manga of the same name) | NASA: Orion; Altair; Lunar base | 2026 |
| CES-51: Freddie Saturn (NASA); Buddy Waters (NASA); Damien Kweller (NASA); Karen Jones (NASA); Linda Cliff (NASA); Hibito Nanba (JAXA) | A crew of astronauts, including the first Japanese astronaut to walk on the Moon (Hibito), launch on an expedition to a lunar base. | | |
| SRP: Sztab, Capt. (no first name given) CASA: Ken Arluk; Richter "Rich" Front Maurice: Drake Matter (Pilot); Wendy Byrd (Co-pilot) | Crater XV (2013), graphic novel | Siberian Rocket Program (SRP) Canadian Arctic Space Agency (CASA): Maurice (railgun) | c. 1987 |
| SRP: Sztab, Capt. (no first name given) CASA: Ken Arluk; Richter "Rich" Front Maurice: Drake Matter (Pilot); Wendy Byrd (Co-pilot) | CASA was established in the 1960s but dissolved after a year. Twenty years later, reunited CASA engineers launch Maurice on one-way flight to the Moon, with 15-year-old Byrd as co-pilot. Sztab's SRP mission was canceled. | | |
| Mike Rodriguez, Cmdr. (USN) (Pilot); Davis; O'Neil (no first names given) Dale (Backup/CAPCOM) (no last name given) | "The Irish Astronaut" (2013), short story | NASA: Aquarius | Near Future |
| Mike Rodriguez, Cmdr. (USN) (Pilot); Davis; O'Neil (no first names given) Dale (Backup/CAPCOM) (no last name given) | After Aquarius disintegrates on return to Earth from the Moon, Dale brings Rodriguez' remains to County Clare in Ireland. Rodriguez was a member of NASA Astronaut Group 19. | | |
| Janet Greenway (Commander); Gary Schroder; Ashley Sutton; Raj; Susie; Jeb (Note: Last names not given for the final three crew members.) | The Resurrection of Ritara (2013), novel | NASA: Diana 4 | c. 2008 (Note: Dialog indicates the story takes place more than 35 years after the last crewed Moon landing.) |
| Janet Greenway (Commander); Gary Schroder; Ashley Sutton; Raj; Susie; Jeb | Crew of the fourth mission in a series of eight planned to renew humanity's exploration of the Moon who disappear along with their spacecraft as it passes behind the Moon. | | |
| Moonbase ARK: Gerard Brauchman, Col. (Commander); Ava Cameron, Lt. Bruce Johns (Senior Engineer); Lance "Doc" Krauss, Dr. (Physician) | Stranded (2013), film | United States: Moonbase ARK (Mineral Exploration Camp); USS Magellan (rescue shuttle) | April 8–9, 2027 |
| Moonbase ARK: Gerard Brauchman, Col. (Commander); Ava Cameron, Lt. Bruce Johns (Senior Engineer); Lance "Doc" Krauss, Dr. (Physician) | Astronauts on mining moonbase infested by alien spores after meteor shower. | | |
| Unnamed (Narrator); Anna (no last name given); MDash; Steve Wong | "Alan Bean Plus Four" (2014), short story | Alan Bean (Command Module) | July–September 2014 |
| Unnamed (Narrator); Anna (no last name given); MDash; Steve Wong | Four friends fly around Moon in privately built spacecraft purchased from widow of pool-supply businessman. | | |
| Lundvik (Captain); Duke; Henry | Doctor Who; Kill the Moon (2014), TV | Space Shuttle | 2049 |
| Lundvik (Captain); Duke; Henry | Space Shuttle crew travels to Moon, which is mysteriously gaining mass, endangering life on Earth. Landing near Mare Fecunditatis. | | |
| Cooper P mine: Brian Thorpe; Unnamed personnel Orion/Surety: Randy Johnston (lander pilot); Colin Bertelli; Suze Baldwin (Orion pilot) | "Low Arc" (2014), short story | Cooper P mine (Australia) NASA: Orion; Surety (lunar lander) | Future (21st century) |
| Cooper P mine: Brian Thorpe; Unnamed personnel Orion/Surety: Randy Johnston (lander pilot); Colin Bertelli; Suze Baldwin (Orion pilot) | Former lunar ice miner Bertelli confronts emergency on NASA science mission to Schrödinger Basin. | | |
| Harley Mathews, Maj. (USAF) (Pilot); Herman Hawthorne | "The Man On The Moon" (2014), short story | Unknown | Contemporary |
| Harley Mathews, Maj. (USAF) (Pilot); Herman Hawthorne | Former NASA astronaut Mathews flies billionaire Hawthorne to the Moon in space capsule resembling log cabin. | | |
| Paul W.R | Le dernier voyage de l'énigmatique Paul W.R (aka The Last Journey of the Enigmatic Paul W.R) (2015), short film Le Dernier Voyage de Paul W.R (aka Last Journey of Paul W.R, The Last Journey) (2020), film | Last Hope | Future |
| Paul W.R | Telepathic astronaut disappears prior to one-way mission to counter threat of "red moon". | | |
| Mémère (nickname; no real name given) (Canada) | Grand-père et la Lune (a.k.a. Grandfather and the Moon) (2015), graphic novel | Unknown | Contemporary/Near Future |
| Mémère (nickname; no real name given) (Canada) | Young girl wins international Who Will Go to the Moon Contest; ejects from spacecraft after launch. | | |
| Sergei Petrova (sic) | Harbinger Down (aka Inanimate) (2015), film | Soviet Union: LK (lunar lander) | June 25, 1982 / Contemporary |
| Sergei Petrova (sic) | Radiation-resistant cosmonaut on secret test of lunar lander who crashed in Bering Sea. | | |
| Tom Desmond, Maj. | Luxna (2016), short film | NASA: Space station Single-occupant lunar spacecraft | Future |
| Tom Desmond, Maj. | Astronaut travels to Moon after being separated from childhood friend. | | |
| Hunter Donovan (USN) (Geologist) Phoenix 2: Franklin "Frank" Wilson, Lt. Col. (USMC) (Commander); Two unnamed astronauts Phoenix 5: Furlong; Mongillo (no first names given); Sydney "Syd" Weaver, Lt. (USN) (call sign Blackfox) (Command Module Pilot) Phoenix 6: Yuen Bai, Cmdr. (PLA Air Force) (Co-Commander); Franklin Wilson, Lt. Col. (Co-Commander); Anthony "Benny" Benevisto, Lt. Cmdr. (USN) (Command Module Pilot/Tech Support); Thomas "Moose" Mosensen, Lt. Cmdr. (USN) (Co-CM Pilot); Yeoh "Bruce" Kong-sang, Dr. (Prof.) (China) (Tech Support); Alan H. Donovan, Dr. (US) (Archeologist); Elias Zell, Dr. (UK) (Archeologist); Soong Yang Zi, Dr. (China) (Forensic Anthropologist) | Ocean of Storms (2016), novel | China: Shenzhou NASA; Phoenix program (Constellation-like): Phoenix 1 Phoenix 2 Phoenix 3 (command modules only); Phoenix 4 Phoenix 5 Phoenix 6: Tai-Ping ("Great Peace") (Shenzhou) (CM)/Copernicus (LM) | Near Future (December 22 – October 7) |
Electromagnetic pulse emanates from artifact buried under Ocean of Storms; NASA undertakes joint Phoenix 6 mission with China after Phoenix 5 launch failure. Wilson and Mosensen are ISS veterans. Hunter Donovan, Alan Donovan's father, was a geologist selected for the Apollo program who never flew due to heart fibrillation.
| Tom (no last name given) | Tom (2016), short film | "N": Thunder | Near Future (September 25) |
| Tom (no last name given) | Astronaut returning from Moon. | | |
| Glenn Cooper (Note: Surname incorrectly given as "Parker" in reference.) | The Stanley Dynamic; The Stanley Astronaut (2017), TV | Unknown | Contemporary |
| Glenn Cooper | Veteran of four Moon missions with Chris Hadfield-like moustache judges high school Aerospace Competition. | | |
| Aditya "Aadhi"/"Adhi" Jataya 1: Karan (Flight Controller); Sanjay (Flight Controller); Riya; Dev | Antariksham 9000 KMPH (2018), film | Indian Space Centre (ISC): Jataya 1 (command module/service module) International Space Station | Near Future |
| Aditya "Aadhi"/"Adhi" Jataya 1: Karan (Flight Controller); Sanjay (Flight Controller); Riya; Dev | Mihira satellite malfunctions 12 years after launch, causing the planned launch of India's first crewed spacecraft to be pulled forward. Dev, a late replacement for Aditya on the crew, insists on redirecting Jataya to Moon on "Mission Kinnera" to retrieve data from lost Vipraayan probe. Karan and Aditya are identical twin brothers. | | |
| Unnamed astronaut | Astroknot (2018), short film | Unknown | Future |
| Unnamed astronaut | Astronaut mates with alien creature on Moon. | | |
| Jonathan (Yonatan) "Jon" Stein (Commander); Unnamed copilot Unnamed mission specialists | The Astronaut's Son (2018), novel | Apollo Aeronautics: Noah's Ark | November 19, 2004 – November 3, 2005 |
| Jonathan (Yonatan) "Jon" Stein (Commander); Unnamed copilot Unnamed mission specialists | Son of Apollo astronaut Avraham Stein commands first crewed Moon mission since 1974. | | |
| Luna Chu | One Small Step (2018), short film | Unknown | November 17, 1995 – Near Future |
| Luna Chu | San Francisco girl grows up to land on Moon. | | |
| Unity Lunar Base: Maxim Goncharov (FKA) Base commander Yue Gao (CNSA) Engineer; Atiya Kabira (Kenia) Astronomer; Kenjiro (JAXA) Geologist/Physicist; Jonathan "Jon" (ESA) Mission Surgeon (No surname given); Wane (NASA) Engineer (No surname given) Ares Mars Spacecraft: Judith Rosenberg (NASA) Mission Commander; Giordano (Giordi) Bruno (ESA) Astronomer/Engineer; Michael Galveston (NASA) Mission Surgeon/Engineer; François (CSA) Geologist (No surname given) Jules Verne: Ella Czyzewska (ESA) | The Wall: Eternal Day (2021), novel | Ares (Mars Spacecraft) Unity Lunar Base | January 1, 2035 – June 16, 2036 |
| Unity Lunar Base: Maxim Goncharov (FKA) Base commander Yue Gao (CNSA) Engineer; Atiya Kabira (Kenia) Astronomer; Kenjiro (JAXA) Geologist/Physicist; Jonathan "Jon" (ESA) Mission Surgeon (No surname given); Wane (NASA) Engineer (No surname given) Ares Mars Spacecraft: Judith Rosenberg (NASA) Mission Commander; Giordano (Giordi) Bruno (ESA) Astronomer/Engineer; Michael Galveston (NASA) Mission Surgeon/Engineer; François (CSA) Geologist (No surname given) Jules Verne: Ella Czyzewska (ESA) | The crew of the Ares mission must interrupt their journey to assist the crew of the Unity lunar base after Earth is engulfed by an alien shell. The lunar base is located at the South Pole, between the Shackleton crater and Mons Malapert. | | |

== See also ==
- Moon landings in fiction
- Moon in science fiction
- List of appearances of the Moon in fiction
