= Adaptations of Twenty Thousand Leagues Under the Seas =

Jules Verne's 1870 novel Twenty Thousand Leagues Under the Seas has been adapted and referenced in popular culture. The following is a list of Adaptations of Twenty Thousand Leagues Under the Seas.

== Stage, film and audio adaptations ==
=== Audio ===
- Twenty Thousand Leagues Under the Seas has been adapted as an audiobook many times, both unabridged and abridged, with some well-known readers, including: 1960's, published by Caedmon Records, read by James Mason (excerpts); 1989, Recorded Books Classics Library Audiobook unabridged version, #89880, in 10 audio-cassettes, 14.5 hours ISBN 1-55690-581-5, performed by Norman Dietz; 1994, published by Naxos Audiobooks, read by John Carlisle (unabridged); 1998, published by Blackstone Audio, read by Frederick Davidson (unabridged); 2008, published by Dove Audio, read by Harlan Ellison (abridged); 2011, published by Listening Library, read by James Frain (unabridged); and 2016, published by CSA Word/Talking Classics, read by Alex Jennings (abridged).
- Twenty Thousand Leagues Under the Seas was adapted into a half-hour episode of the NBC radio series Favorite Story hosted by Ronald Colman and broadcast December 20, 1947 as the favorite story of Orson Welles.
- 20,000 Leagues Under the Sea (1961), an 8-part serial adaptation broadcast on the BBC Home Service.
- In 1963, Disneyland Records released The Story of 20,000 Leagues Under the Sea (ST-1924), a loose adaptation of both the Verne novel and the 1954 Walt Disney film. This version is more family-friendly, changes the character of "Conseil" from Professor Aronnax's manservant to his nephew and provides a "happy ending".
- In 1974, Wonderland Records released 20,000 Leagues Under the Sea (LP-294), a loose adaptation of the Verne novel. This version changes the characters' names to "Professor Anthony Aronnax" and "Ned Baker", added the character of "Commander Smith" and changes the character of Captain Nemo into a megalomaniac bent on world domination.
- A radio adaptation was broadcast on The General Mills Radio Adventure Theater, hosted by Tom Bosley, on March 13, 1977.
- 20,000 Leagues Under the Sea (2001) – A radio drama adaption of Jules Verne's novel aired in the United States.
- Nigel Anthony performed a five-episode abridged reading of the novel on BBC Radio 7 in May 2010; it was rebroadcast in November that same year.
- Twenty Thousand Leagues Under the Sea (2015) – A double album recorded by Dutch post-rock trio I Could Float Here Forever, published by independent record label MoonSwing. This adaptation consists of twenty two tracks and features 24 illustrations portraying the occurrences in the story. As it attempts to musically render an extra-musical narrative, it is to be considered a modern example of program music
- A new radio adaptation by Gregory Evans was broadcast on BBC Radio 4 on 29 July 2018 as part of its To The Ends of the Earth drama series, featuring Sagar Arya as Nemo, Neil McCaul as Professor Aronnax. David Seddon as Ned Land and Madeline Hatt as Connie Aronnax.

=== Stage ===
- 20,000 Leagues Under the Sea (1874) – musical – libretto Joseph Bradford – music G. Operti.
- A stage play adaptation by Walk the Plank (2003). In this version, the "Nautilese" private language used by the Nautilus's crew was kept, represented by a mixture of Polish and Persian.
- Twenty Thousand Leagues Under the Sea (2006). A stage play adaptation by Ade Morris for the Watermill Theatre, Bagnor, England. This version was for six actors and used physical theatre to help tell the story, which emphasised parallels in Verne's original with contemporary world events.

=== Theatrical films ===
- 20.000 Leagues Under the Sea (1905 film) by Wallace McCutcheon
- Under the Seas (1907) – The silent short movie by French filmmaker Georges Méliès.
- 20,000 Leagues Under the Sea (1916) – The first feature film based on the novel. The actor Allan Holubar played Captain Nemo.
- 20,000 Leagues Under the Sea (1954) – Probably the most well-known film adaptation of the book, a live-action film directed by Richard Fleischer, produced by Walt Disney, and starring Kirk Douglas as Ned Land, James Mason as Captain Nemo and Peter Lorre as Conseil.
- Captain Nemo and the Underwater City (1969) – A British film based on characters from the novel, starring Robert Ryan as Captain Nemo.
- The Black Hole (1979) – A loose film adaptation by Disney with a science-fiction/spaceship setting.
- Atlantis: The Lost Empire (2001) – A Disney animated film loosely inspired by the setting of Twenty Thousand Leagues Under the Seas.
- The League of Extraordinary Gentlemen (2003) – Although not an adaptation of the Verne novel and based on the comic book of the same name by Alan Moore and Kevin O'Neill, it does feature Captain Nemo and the Nautilus as a member of the "League" of 19th-century superheroes. The character is of Indian descent and is portrayed by Naseeruddin Shah.
- 30,000 Leagues Under the Sea (2007) – A modern update on the classic book starring Lorenzo Lamas as Lt. Aronnaux and Sean Lawlor as Captain Nemo.

=== Television ===
- 20,000 Leagues Under the Sea (1952) – A two-part adaptation for the science fiction television anthology Tales of Tomorrow. (Part One was subtitled The Chase, Part Two was subtitled The Escape.)
- 20,000 Leagues Under the Sea (1972) – A two-part episode of the American animated television series from Rankin/Bass, Festival of Family Classics, adapted by Richard Neubert and animated by Topcraft in Japan.
- Captain Nemo (Капитан Немо) (1975) – A Soviet 3-episode TV adaptation
- The Undersea Adventures of Captain Nemo (1975) – A futuristic version of Captain Nemo and the Nautilus appeared in this Canadian animated television series.
- The Return of Captain Nemo (1978), sometimes known as The Amazing Captain Nemo, starred Jose Ferrer in the title role.
- 20,000 Leagues Under the Sea (Dvacet tisíc mil pod mořem) (1980) – A Czechoslovak television movie starring Jiří Adamíra as Captain Nemo, Jiří Pleskot as Professor Arronax, Vítězslav Jandák as Conseil, and Jirí Schmitzer as Ned Land. Directed by Pavel Kraus.
- 20,000 Leagues Under the Sea (1985) – A made-for-television animated film by Burbank Films Australia starring Tom Burlinson as Ned Land.
- The second half of the animated television series Willy Fog 2 (1994–95), the sequel of Around the World with Willy Fog, produced by Spanish studio BRB Internacional and Televisión Española, is based on Twenty Thousand Leagues Under the Seas. BRB Internacional heavily edited that second half of the series down to a truncated 75 minutes direct-to-video film later.
- 20,000 Leagues Under the Sea (1997) – A television miniseries starring Michael Caine as Captain Nemo, Patrick Dempsey as Aronnax, Mia Sara and Bryan Brown as Ned Land
- 20,000 Leagues Under the Sea (1997, Hallmark) – A made-for-television film starring Ben Cross as Captain Nemo and Richard Crenna as Professor Aronnax.
- Nadia: The Secret of Blue Water (1990–1991) and Nadia: The Secret of Fuzzy (1992) – A Japanese science fiction anime television series and film directed by Hideaki Anno, and inspired by the book and exploits of Captain Nemo.
- 20,000 Leagues Under the Sea (2002) – A DIC (now owned by Cookie Jar) children's animated television film loosely based on the novel. It premiered on television on Nickelodeon Sunday Movie Toons and was released on DVD and VHS shortly afterward by MGM Home Entertainment.
- Nautilus (2024) – A British ten-part adventure drama television miniseries created by James Dormer.

=== Video games ===
- 20,000 Leagues Under the Sea (1988) - A point-and-click adventure game for PCs, published by Coktel Vision.
- An FMV-based game titled 20,000 Leagues: The Adventure Continues was being developed by SouthPeak Interactive in 1998. However, it was never released.
- 20,000 Leagues Under the Sea (2009) – A hidden object game on iPad, iPhone and MAC published by Anuman Interactive.

=== Board games ===
- Nemo's War (2017) - A mainly solitaire board game created by Chris Taylor. It has multiple editions and expansions.
- "Flip Voyage" (2025) - A Flip & Write game created by Steven Aramini.
- "20,000 Leagues Under the Sea" (2025) - A Flip & Write game published by Looping Games.
- The boardgame "Raiders of the Deep: U-boats of the Great War 1914-18" published by Compass Games includes an unofficial add-on featuring Captain Nemo's Nautilus. The add-on suggests that Nemo survived until WWI and continued his quest for revenge against the Allied empires.

== Comic book and graphic adaptations ==
Twenty Thousand Leagues Under the Seas has been adapted into comic book format numerous times.

- In 1948, Gilberton Publishing published a comic adaptation in issue #47 of their Classics Illustrated series. It was reprinted in 1955; 1968; 1978, this time by King Features Syndicate as issue #8 of their King Classics series; and again in 1997, this later time by Acclaim/Valiant. Art by was Henry C. Kiefer.
- In 1954, the newspaper strip Walt Disney's Treasury of Classic Tales published a comic based on the 1954 film, which ran from August 1-December 26, 1954. This was translated into many languages worldwide. Adaptation was by Frank Reilly, with art by Jesse Marsh.
- In 1955, Dell Comics published a comic based on the 1954 film in issue #614 of their Four Color anthology series called Walt Disney's 20,000 Leagues Under The Sea. This was reprinted by Hjemmet in Norway in 1955 & 1976, by Gold Key in 1963, and in 1977 was serialized in several issues of Western's The New Micky Mouse Club Funbook, beginning with issue #11190. Art was by Frank Thorne.
- In 1963, in conjunction with the first nationwide re-release of the film, Gold Key published a comic based on the 1954 film called Walt Disney's 20,000 Leagues Under The Sea. This reprinted the Frank Thorne version.
- In 1963, Gold Key published Walt Disney's World Of Adventure, which featured The Adventures Of Captain Nemo, a prequel to the Disney film. Story & art were by Dan Spiegle, who eventually did 6 episodes of the series between 1963-1972.
- In 1972, IPC in England published Donald And Mickey. The first 12 issues featured The Adventures Of Captain Nemo, with art by Sam Fair.
- In 1973, Vince Fago's Pendulum Press published a hardcover illustrated book. This collected a new version which had been previously serialized in Weekly Reader magazine. Adaptation was by Otto Binder, with art by Romy Gaboa & Ernie Patricio. This was reprinted in 1976 by Marvel Comics in issue #4 of their Marvel Classics Comics series; in 1984 by Academic Industries, Inc. as issue #C12 of their Classics Illustrated paperback book series; in 1990 again by Pendulum Press, with a new painted cover; and again, using the same cover, in 2010 by Saddleback Publishing, Inc., this time in color.
- In 1974, Power Records published a comic and record set, PR-42. Art was by Rich Buckler & Dick Giordano.
- In 1975, Look And Learn Ltd. in England published an adaptation of Twenty Thousand Leagues Under The Sea as 11 chapters in issues 707-717 of their Look And Learn magazine. This version was reprinted in late 1980 by Fleetway in their Lion Annual 1981.
- In 1976, Marvel Comics published a comic book adaptation via issue #4 of their Marvel Classics Comics line. This was a reprint of the Pendulum Press version.
- In 1990, Pendulum Press published another comic based on the novel via issue #4 of their Illustrated Stories line. This was a reprint of the Pendulum Press version, with a new painted cover.
- In 1992, Dark Horse Comics published a one shot comic called Dark Horse Classics. This was originally announced as part of the Berkeley/First Comics Classics Illustrated series, as a full-color "prestige format" book, but was delayed when the company went bankrupt. The Dark Horse version was scaled back to a standard comic-book format with B&W interiors. It was reprinted in 2001 by Hieronymous Press as a limited-edition of 50 copies available only from the artist's website, and more recently, in 2008 from Flesk Publications as an expensive full-color book, as originally intended. Adaptation & art by Gary Gianni.
- In 1997, Acclaim/Valiant published CLASSICS ILLUSTRATED #8. This was a reprint of the 1948 Gilberton version with a new cover.
- In 2001, Hieronymus Press published a reprint of the Dark Horse Comics version, with a new cover, as a limited-edition of 50 copies, available only from Gary Gianni's website.
- In 2006, Seven Seas Entertainment released Captain Nemo, a sequel to Twenty Thousand Leagues Under the Seas.
- In 2008, Sterling Graphics published a pop-up graphic book.
- In 2008, Capstone Publishers / Stone Arch Books published a graphic novel called Twenty-Thousand Leagues Under The Sea. The adaptation was by Carl Bowen, the cartoon-style art by Jose Alfonso Ocampo Ruiz, and the coloring by Benny Fuentes.
- In 2009, Flesk Publications published a graphic novel called Twenty-Thousand Leagues Under The Sea. This was a reprint, in color for the first time, of the Gary Gianni version.
- In 2010, Saddleback Publishing, Inc. published a new reprint of the Pendulum Press version, this time in color, and reusing the 1990 cover painting.
- In 2010, Campfire Classics, a company in India, published a new version. Adaptation was by Dan Rafter, with art by Bhupendra Ahluwalia.
- In 2011, Campfire Classic published a trade paperback.
- In 2012, Glénat Editions published Nemo, a graphic novel by French artist Brüno. It had previously been released in four parts from 2001 to 2004. In 2017, IDW Publishing published an English translation.
- Polish painter Waldemar Andrzejewski adapted the novel as a comic book titled Kapitan Nemo (Captain Nemo). Its creation is estimated at late 1970s or early 1980s; the exact date is unknown, as the comic book was discovered in 2015, after the author's death.

== References in popular culture ==
- The 1979 novel The Neverending Story by Michael Ende, and its film adaptations, uses Nemo's battle with the giant squid as an example of the unforgettable and immersive nature of great stories.
- A 1989 episode of The Super Mario Bros. Super Show!, entitled "20,000 Koopas Under the Sea", borrows many elements from the original story (including a submarine named the "Koopilus" and King Koopa referring to himself as "Koopa Nemo").
- In a 1989 episode "20,000 Leaks Under the City" of the Teenage Mutant Ninja Turtles series is heavily based on Twenty Thousand Leagues Under the Seas, including a battle with a giant squid. This story takes place in New York City of the 1980s where a flood caused by Krang using a Super Pump has occurred.
- A SpongeBob SquarePants episode is called "20,000 Patties Under the Sea". It is a parody of 20,000 Leagues Under the Seas and of the traveling song "99 Bottles of Beer on the Wall".
- In the 2006 "The Evil Beneath" segment of "The Evil Beneath/Carl Wheezer, Boy Genius" season 3 double episode from the Nicktoons children's CG animated series The Adventures of Jimmy Neutron: Boy Genius references are made to similar characters and environments: Dr. Sydney Orville Moist, a paranoid dance-crazy genius scientist (parodying Captain Nemo) who lives in a hidden underwater headquarters (stationary Nautilus) at the bottom of fictional Bahama Quadrangle, takes revenge against humanity by transforming unsuspecting tourists like Jimmy, Carl and Sheen into zombie-like algae men (the Nautilus crew).
- In the 1990 science-fiction comedy film, Back to the Future Part III, Dr. Emmett Brown (Christopher Lloyd) states that Jules Verne is his favourite author and adores Twenty Thousand Leagues Under the Seas. At the end of the film, Dr. Brown introduces his two sons, named Jules and Verne respectively.
- A 1994 Saturday Night Live sketch (featuring Kelsey Grammer as Captain Nemo) pokes fun at the misconception of leagues being a measure of depth instead of a measure of distance. Nemo tries repeatedly, though unsuccessfully, to convince his crew of this.
- One of the inaugural rides at Walt Disney World's Magic Kingdom was called 20,000 Leagues Under the Sea: Submarine Voyage and was based on the Disney movie.
- In the 1987 novel and 1998 film Sphere, Harry Adams (played by Samuel L. Jackson) reads and takes an interest in 20,000 Leagues Under the Seas.
- Captain Nemo is one of the main characters in Alan Moore's and Kevin O'Neill's graphic novel The League of Extraordinary Gentlemen, as well as in the 2003 film.
- In the 2001 Clive Cussler novel Valhalla Rising, reference to a submarine that "inspired" Verne's story is made as one of the central plot points; it differs in having been British, with Verne being accused of being anti-British.
- Nemo and the Nautilus, along with several other plot points, are major elements of Kevin J. Anderson's Captain Nemo: The Fantastic History of a Dark Genius.
- The novel series Chronicles of the Imaginarium Geographica depicts Captain Nemo in a "world within a world". In this version, Nemo is the captain of the sentient ship Yellow Dragon (stated to be the in-universe origin of the Nautilus) and therefore a prominent figure in the series. Jules Verne's character is said to be fiction based on him.
- Mentioned in the 1996 novel Into the Wild as one of Chris McCandless' inspirations, before his trek into the Alaskan interior.
- The Nautilus is said to be based on a civil war era ship in the novel, Leviathan by David Lynn Golemon.
- An achievement in World of Warcraft: Cataclysm is called "20,000 Leagues Under the Sea" and is awarded after completing a quests in the Vashj'ir zone. This includes travelling in a submarine, being attacked by a giant squid and ultimately trying to stop the Naga from overthrowing Neptulon. There is also a submarine built by the goblins that looks similar to Disney's portrayal of the Nautilus, piloted by Captain "Jewels" Verne. The submarine has appropriately been dubbed "The Verne" (after Jules Verne).
- On February 8, 2011 the Google homepage featured an interactive logo adapted from 20,000 Leagues Under the Seas honoring Jules Verne's 183rd birthday.
- The novel I, Nemo, by J. Dharma and Deanna Windham, is a re-imagining of Captain Nemo's origins told from his point of view. This book ends where Twenty Thousand Leagues Under the Seas begins and is the first in a three-part series.
- British author Adam Roberts reworks Verne's original with his 2015 novel Twenty Trillion Leagues Under the Sea. Unlike Verne's original, where the distance specified is a horizontal voyage, Roberts's submarine travels vertically the stated mileage.
- American author Lewis Crow uses the events of Verne's book as the background for his novels The Nautilus Legacy and The Lone Captain, which tell the life story of Captain Nemo's son.
- The Japanese otome visual novel, Code: Realize- Guardian of Rebirth, features a scientist named Nemo. Nemo created an airship named the Nautilus within the game. He considers the engineer Impey Barbicane, a reference to another Jules Verne novel, his ultimate scientific rival.
- Referenced and featured in the ABC television series Once Upon A Time
- In the final episode of season 1 of Around the World in 80 Days (2021),Twenty Thousand Leagues Under the Seas is alluded to as Phileas Fogg and his companions depart for their next adventure. The series has since been renewed for a second season, but it is yet to be confirmed if it will adapt Verne’s submarine novel.
- The English indie pop band Marine Girls, featuring singer Tracey Thorn, referenced the novel in their song "20,000 Leagues" from their 1981 album Beach Party.

== See also ==
- List of underwater science fiction works
