= Smart Feller Fart Smeller =

2006 book by Jon Agee

Smart Feller Fart Smeller: And Other Spoonerisms
- Author: Jon Agee
- Illustrator: Jon Agee
- Language: English
- Genre: children's books; picture books
- Publisher: Michael di Caupa Books
- Publication date: 2006
- Publication place: United States

Smart Feller Fart Smeller: And Other Spoonerisms is a 2006 book by Jon Agee.

== Book information ==
The book is filled with spoonerisms that are formed as questions or answers. The book starts with a brief introduction about William Archibald Spooner and closes the book with translations of each punch line. There are 28 examples with black and white illustrations.

== Reception ==
A Publishers Weekly review says, "It's easy to imagine these precocious quips becoming part of a vocabulary ("That's a lack of pies!" a baker tells Pinocchio), and aficionados of this quiz would do well to read Shel Silverstein's Runny Babbit, another boonerific spook." A Kirkus Reviews review says, "His humor in these 28 examples is sometimes crude (see title, which answers, "What did the cowboy say to the rocket scientist?"), and, as in Shel Silverstein's Runny Babbit (2005), the joke definitely wears thin — but readers of the target mentality may be tempted to rake the tall and bun with it." Kitty Flynn, of The Horn Book Magazine, reviewed the book saying, "It makes you wonder: the next time someone calls you a 'smart feller', is that really what’s meant?"
