= Jon Agee =

Writer and illustrator (born 1960)

- Born: 1960 (age 65–66); Nyack, New York, U.S.
- Occupations: Children's book writer, illustrator, cartoonist
- Known for: Picture books and collections centered on wordplay (palindromes, anagrams, etc.)
- Notable work: Dmitri the Astronaut; Smart Feller Fart Smeller
- Awards: Symmys palindrome award winner (2013, 2021)

Jon Agee (born 1960) is an American children's book writer and illustrator whose work centers around wordplay. Since 1981, he has published more than 31 books.

== Early life and education ==
Agee was born in Nyack, New York in 1960. He attended Cooper Union School of Art and graduated with a BFA degree.

== Career ==
Agee's art style is known for its "trademark blocky ink-and-watercolor illustrations," according to The New York Times.

In the 1990s, he wrote two musicals for children for the Tada! theater company, one of which was titled B.O.T.C.H, short for Bureau of Turmoil, Chaos and Headaches, a fictional New York City agency in charge of disrupting city functioning.

He has written cartoons for The New Yorker.

Agee has published several books of palindromes and word play such as anagrams and oxymorons. He became interested in them after a friend started writing them. "I liked the way absurdity and logic were intertwined," Agee said. In its review of Agee's book of 60 illustrated oxymorons called Who Ordered the Jumbo Shrimp? The New York Times wrote that "it would be a near miss, if not a minor catastrophe, not to take the calculated risk of treating the whole family to this instant classic."

His books include the 1996 picture book Dmitri the Astronaut, Smart Feller Fart Smeller, and many more.

At the first annual Symmys palindrome awards, he won in the short palindrome category for "An igloo costs a lot, Ed! Amen. One made to last! So cool, Gina!". He also won in 2021.

== Personal life ==
Agee lives in San Francisco with his wife, Audrey. He enjoys crossword puzzles. In 2003, New York Times puzzle editor Will Shortz wrote that Agee had thanked him for including his name in a Friday crossword and joked that "he would not be satisfied until his name appeared in a Monday puzzle, the easiest of the week, where every answer is supposed to be familiar to most solvers. Only then would he know that he had truly arrived."

== List of works ==
=== Picture books ===
- If Snow Falls (1982)
- Ellsworth (1983)
- Ludlow Laughs (1985)
- The Incredible Painting of Felix Clousseau (1988)
- The Return of Freddy LeGrand (1992)
- Flapstick (1993)
- Dmitri the Astronaut (1996)
- The Return of Freddy Legrand (1999)
- Milo's Hat Trick (2001)
- When Z Goes Home (2003)
- Terrific (2005)
- Why Did the Chicken Cross the Road? (2006)
- Nothing (2007)
- The Retired Kid (2008)
- My Rhinoceros (2011)
- The Other Side of Town (2012)
- Little Santa (2013)
- It's Only Stanley (2015)
- Lion Lessons (2016)
- Life on Mars (2017)
- The Wall in the Middle of the Book (2018)
- I Want a Dog (2019)
- My Dad Is a Tree (2023)

=== Collections of word play ===
- Go Hang a Salami! I'm a Lasagna Hog!: And Other Palindromes (1991)
- So Many Dynamos!: And Other Palindromes (1994)
- Who Ordered the Jumbo Shrimp?: And Other Oxymorons (1998)
- Sit on a Potato Pan, Otis!: More Palindromes (1999)
- Elvis Lives!: And Other Anagrams (2000)
- Palindromania! (2002)
- Smart Feller Fart Smeller: And Other Spoonerisms (2006)
- Orangutan Tongs: Poems to Tangle Your Tongue (2009)
- Mr. Putney's Quacking Dog (2010)
- Otto: A Palindrama (2021)

=== As illustrator ===
- Natalie Babbitt and others, The Big Book for Peace (1990)
- Dee Lillegard, Sitting in My Box (1989)
- Tor Seidler, Mean Margaret (1997)
- Erica Silverman, The Halloween House (1998)
- William Steig, Potch & Polly (2002)
