= Spoonerism =

Humorous muddled words

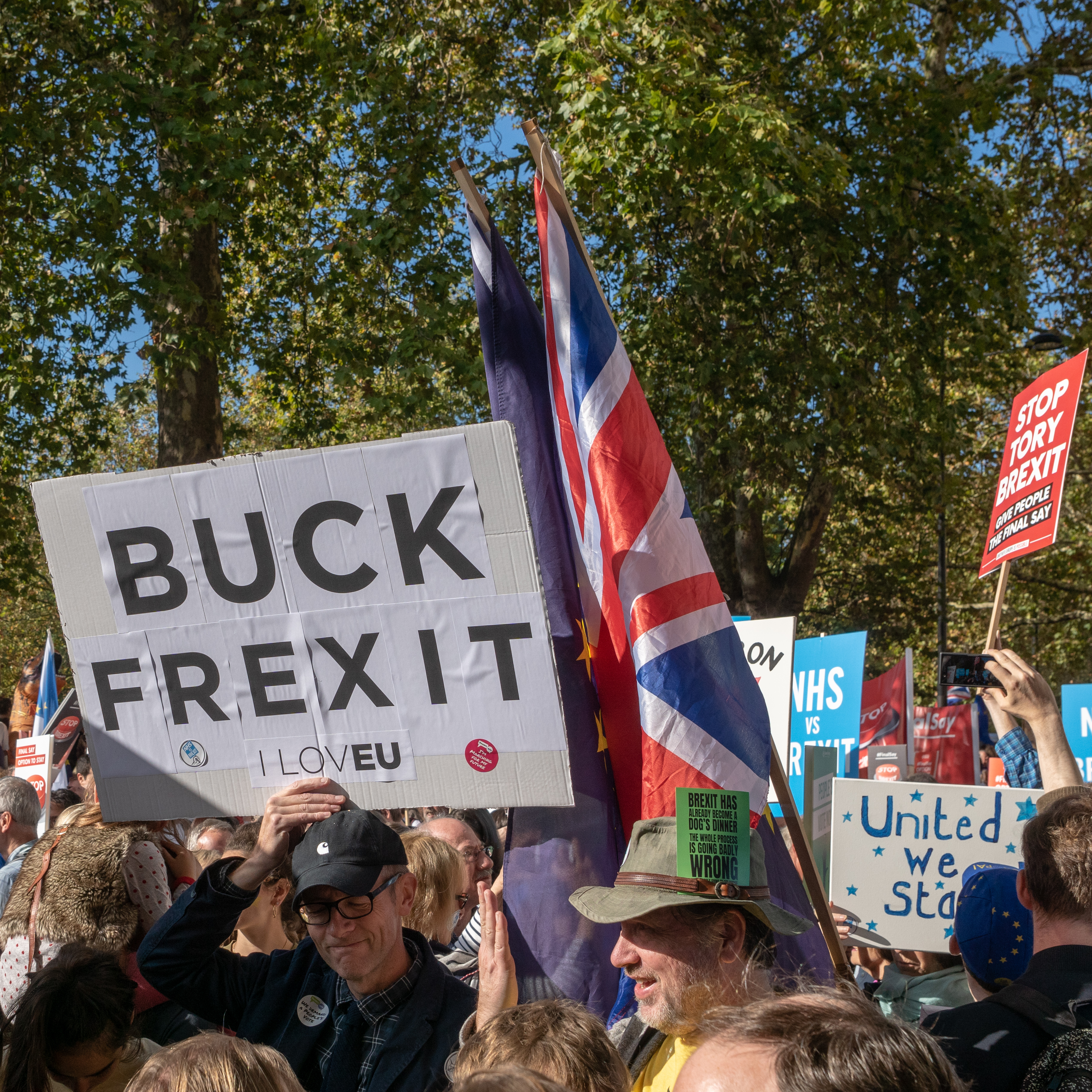
An example of spoonerism on a protest placard in London: "Buck Frexit" instead of "Fuck Brexit"

A spoonerism is an occurrence of speech in which corresponding consonants, vowels, or morphemes are switched (see metathesis) between two words of a phrase. (Note: The definition of Spoonerism in the 1924 edition of the Oxford English Dictionary is: "An accidental transposition of the initial sounds, or other parts, of two or more words.") These are named after the Oxford don and priest William Archibald Spooner, who reportedly commonly spoke in this way.

Examples include saying "blushing crow" instead of "crushing blow", or "runny babbit" instead of "bunny rabbit". While spoonerisms are commonly heard as slips of the tongue, they can also be used intentionally as a word play. Since the rise of the Internet and wordfilters, spoonerisms have also become deliberately used as filter-avoidance spellings of filtered terms.

The first known spoonerisms were published by the 16th-century author François Rabelais and termed contrepèteries. In his novel Pantagruel, he wrote "femme folle à la messe et femme molle à la fesse" ("insane woman at Mass, woman with flabby buttocks").

== Etymology ==
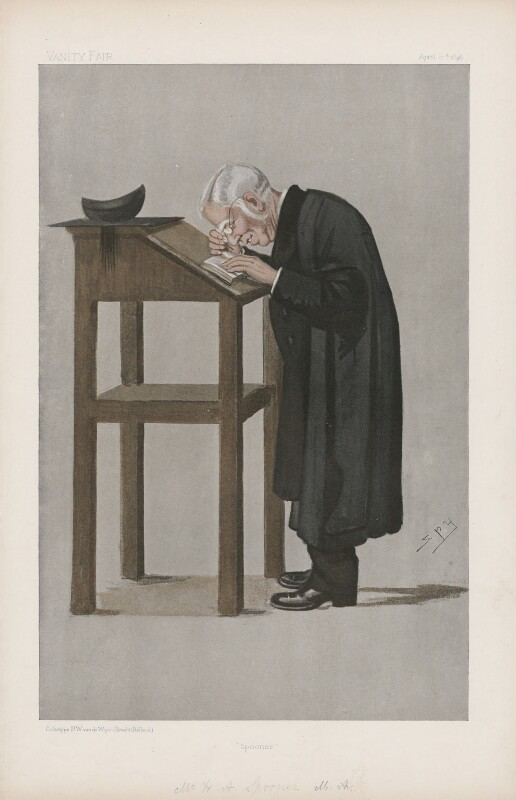
Spooner as caricatured by Spy (Leslie Ward) in Vanity Fair, April 1898

Spoonerisms are named for the Reverend William Archibald Spooner (1844–1930), Warden from 1903 to 1924 of New College, Oxford, who was allegedly susceptible to this mistake. The Oxford English Dictionary records the word spoonerism as early as 1900. The term was well-established by 1921 – an article in The Times from that year reports that:

The boys of Aldro School, Eastbourne, ... have been set the following task for the holidays: Discover and write down something about: The Old Lady of Threadneedle-street, a Spoonerism, a Busman's Holiday...

An article in the Daily Herald in 1928 reported spoonerisms to be a "legend". In that piece, Robert Seton, once a student of Spooner's, claimed that Spooner:

...made, to my knowledge, only one "Spoonerism" in his life, in 1879, when he stood in the pulpit and announced the hymn: 'Kinkering Kongs their Titles Take' ["Conquering Kings their Titles Take"]...Later, a friend and myself brought out a book of "spoonerisms".

In 1937, The Times quoted a detective describing a man as "a bricklabourer's layer" and used "Police Court Spoonerism" as the headline.

A spoonerism is also known as a marrowsky or morowski, purportedly after an 18th-century Polish count who suffered from the same impediment.

== Examples ==
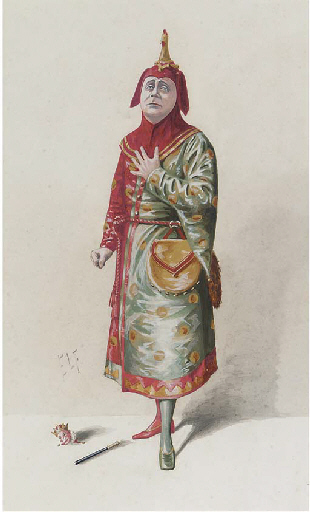
Caricature of Charles H. Workman. The accompanying biography reads, "The only part of him which gets tired is his tongue, and occasionally the oft-repeated lines have got muddled. 'Self-constricted ruddles', 'his striggles were terruffic', and 'deloberately rib me' are a few of the spoonerisms he has perpetrated."

Most of the quotations attributed to Spooner are apocryphal; The Oxford Dictionary of Quotations (3rd edition, 1979) lists only one substantiated spoonerism: "The weight of rages will press hard upon the employer" (instead of "rate of wages"). Spooner himself claimed that "The Kinquering Congs Their Titles Take" (in reference to a hymn) was his sole spoonerism. Most spoonerisms were probably never uttered by William Spooner himself but rather invented by colleagues and students as a pastime. Richard Lederer, calling "Kinkering Kongs their Titles Take" (with an alternative spelling) one of the "few" authenticated spoonerisms, dates it to 1879, and he gives nine examples "attributed to Spooner, most of them spuriously". They are as follows:

- "Three cheers for our queer old dean!" (while giving a toast at a dinner, which Queen Victoria was also attending)
- "Is it kisstomary to cuss the bride?" (as opposed to "customary to kiss")
- "The Lord is a shoving leopard." (instead of "a loving shepherd")
- "A blushing crow." ("crushing blow")
- "A well-boiled icicle" ("well-oiled bicycle")
- "You were fighting a liar in the quadrangle." ("lighting a fire")
- "Is the bean dizzy?" ("Dean busy")
- "Someone is occupewing my pie. Please sew me to another sheet." ("Someone is occupying my pew. Please show me to another seat.")
- "You have hissed all my mystery lectures. You have tasted a whole worm. Please leave Oxford on the next town drain." ("You have missed all my history lectures. You have wasted a whole term. Please leave Oxford on the next down train.")

== Usage ==
In modern terms, spoonerism generally refers to any changing of sounds in this manner.

=== Comedy ===
- The long-running British comedy television show The Two Ronnies regularly featured segments with Ronnie Barker delivering a mock-serious speech littered with spoonerisms, written by Barker.

Writing in tribute for the inaugural Ronnie Barker Talk, Ben Elton wrote:

What an honour. I grew up loving Ronnie Barker and can only hope the news that I am to give a talk in his name doesn't leave him spitting spiritedly splenetic spoonerisms in comedy heaven.

- The Washington, D.C. political comedy group Capitol Steps had a long-standing tradition of performing a routine named "Lirty Dies" during every performance, which features a typically 10-minute-long barrage of rapid-fire topical spoonerisms. A few examples over the years range from "Resident Pagan" (President Reagan) and the US's periodic practice of "Licking their Peaders" (Picking their leaders) to the NSA "poopin' on Snutin" (Snoopin' on Putin) and "phugging everybody's bones" (bugging everybody's phones).
- Comedian Jane Ace was notorious for her spoonerisms and other similar plays on words during her time as main actress of the radio situation comedy Easy Aces.
- The Season 3 Ted Lasso episode "Signs" sees Rebecca Welton bump into her ex-boyfriend who is referred to as a "shite in nining armor", a spoonerism of "knight in shining armor".

=== Literature ===
- Comedian F. Chase Taylor was the main actor of the 1930s radio program Stoopnagle and Budd, in which his character, Colonel Stoopnagle, used spoonerisms. In 1945, he published a book, My Tale Is Twisted, consisting of 44 "spoonerised" versions of well-known children's stories. Subtitled "Wart Pun: Aysop's Feebles" and "Tart Pooh: Tairy and Other Fales," these included such tales as "Beeping Sleauty" for "Sleeping Beauty". The book was republished in 2001 by Stone and Scott Publishers as Stoopnagle's Tale is Twisted.
- In 2005, HarperCollins published the late humorist Shel Silverstein's Runny Babbit: A Billy Sook, a book about a rabbit whose parents "Dummy and Mad" gave him spoonerized chores, such as having to "Dash the wishes" (for "wash the dishes").
- In his poem "Translation," Brian P. Cleary describes a boy named Alex who speaks in spoonerisms (like "shook a tower" instead of "took a shower"). Humorously, Cleary leaves the poem's final spoonerism to the reader when he says:

He once proclaimed, "Hey, belly jeans"
When he found a stash of jelly beans.
But when he says he pepped in stew
We'll tell him he should wipe his shoe.

- In D. H. Lawrence & Susan his Cow (1939), literary critic William York Tindall described behavioral psychologists as "occupied with nothing more spiritual than pulling habits out of rats". (This quip is commonly cited to Douglas Bush, who used it in a lecture two years later.)

=== Crosswords ===
Spoonerisms are used in cryptic crossword clues and use a play on words, in which the initial sounds or syllables of two words are switched to provide a solution. The clue type is generally indicated by a direct reference to 'Spooner', or 'Rev', although more tricky examples might use such phrases as 'in a manner of speaking', or 'slip of the tongue', etc. Uniquely, in cryptic crosswords the words used to create the Spoonerism might only be hinted at, not explicitly stated.

Example: "Spooner's criminal with nurse finding hiding places." (4,3,6)

Solution: NOOK AND CRANNY (Spoonerism of CROOK AND NANNY).

=== Music ===
- The title of the Van der Graaf Generator's 1971 album Pawn Hearts resulted from a spoonerism by David Jackson, who said one time: "I'll go down to the studio and dub on some more porn hearts", meaning to say 'horn parts'.
- American indie rock musician Ritt Momney's name is a spoonerism of the name of the American politician Mitt Romney.
- American synthwave musician Com Truise's name is a spoonerism of the name of American actor Tom Cruise.
- Estonian complextro musician Mord Fustang's name is a spoonerism of the well-known Ford Mustang muscle car.
- English rapper Loyle Carner's stage name is a spoonerism of his double-barrelled surname Coyle-Larner as well as a reference to his childhood struggle with his ADHD and dyslexia diagnoses.
- American mathcore band The Callous Daoboys is a spoonerism of the Dallas Cowboys.
- Dutch electronic musician San Holo's name is a spoonerism of the Star Wars character Han Solo. This led Walt Disney Pictures to send a cease and desist letter for copyright infringement with potential penalty estimated between $5 million and $10 million.
- American thrash metal band Metallica released a live concert DVD in 1998, titled Cunning Stunts, with it being meant as a spoonerism for "stunning cunts".
- American hip-hop artist Tyler, the Creator's street-wear brand, Golf Wang, is a spoonerism of LA hip-hop music collective "Odd Future Wolf Gang Kill Them All", which he was a former member of.
- The title of American punk rock band NOFX's debut studio album, Liberal Animation, is a spoonerism of the phrase "animal liberation", and their fifth one, Punk in Drublic, one of "drunk in public".

=== Radio ===
On the 3 December 1950 episode of The Jack Benny Program, Jack mentions that he ran into his butler Rochester while in his car that was on a grease rack. Mary Livingston was supposed to say "How could you run into him on a grease rack?" but flubbed her line with "How could you run into him on a grass reek?" The audience laughed so much that Jack was unable to reply as the show ran out of time.

=== False etymology ===
Spoonerisms are used sometimes in false etymologies. For example, according to linguist Ghil'ad Zuckermann, some wrongly believe that the English word butterfly derives from flutter by.

== Scientific research ==
Spoonerisms are not only observed in popular culture but have also been studied extensively in laboratory settings. Researchers have used spoonerisms to investigate mechanisms of self-monitoring in speech production. One common experimental method is the SLIP test (Spoonerism of Laboratory-Induced Predisposition), which attempts to elicit controlled speech errors. In a SLIP task, participants view a series of word pairs that are constructed so that exchanging the initial consonants is likely to produce a spoonerism; for example, the pair "balm peach" is intended to prime the response "palm beach".

SLIP paradigms have been used to examine psychological and linguistic processes, including differences in error production between individuals with high and low defensiveness. SLIP tasks have also been combined with electroencephalography (EEG) to examine neural activity involved in suppressing taboo or socially inappropriate speech.

Research using spoonerisms has also explored their relationship to working memory and has been incorporated into the study of phonological awareness in both typical and atypical language development.

== Kniferisms and forkerisms ==
As complements to spoonerism, Douglas Hofstadter used the nonce words kniferism and forkerism to refer to changing, respectively, the vowels or the final consonants of two syllables, giving them a new meaning. Examples of so-called kniferisms include a British television newsreader once referring to the police at a crime scene removing a "hypodeemic nerdle"; a television announcer once saying that "All the world was thrilled by the marriage of the Duck and Doochess of Windsor"; and during a live radio broadcast in 1931, radio presenter Harry von Zell accidentally mispronouncing U.S. President Herbert Hoover's name as "Hoobert Heever".

== See also ==
- Blend word
- Blooper
- Bushism
- Crash blossom
- Freudian slip
- Malapropism
- Metathesis
- Mondegreen
- Opperlandse taal- & letterkunde (book)
- Parody
- Phonemic paraphasia
- Sananmuunnos (spoonerisms in Finnish)
- Smart Feller Fart Smeller: And Other Spoonerisms (book)
