= Gold key =

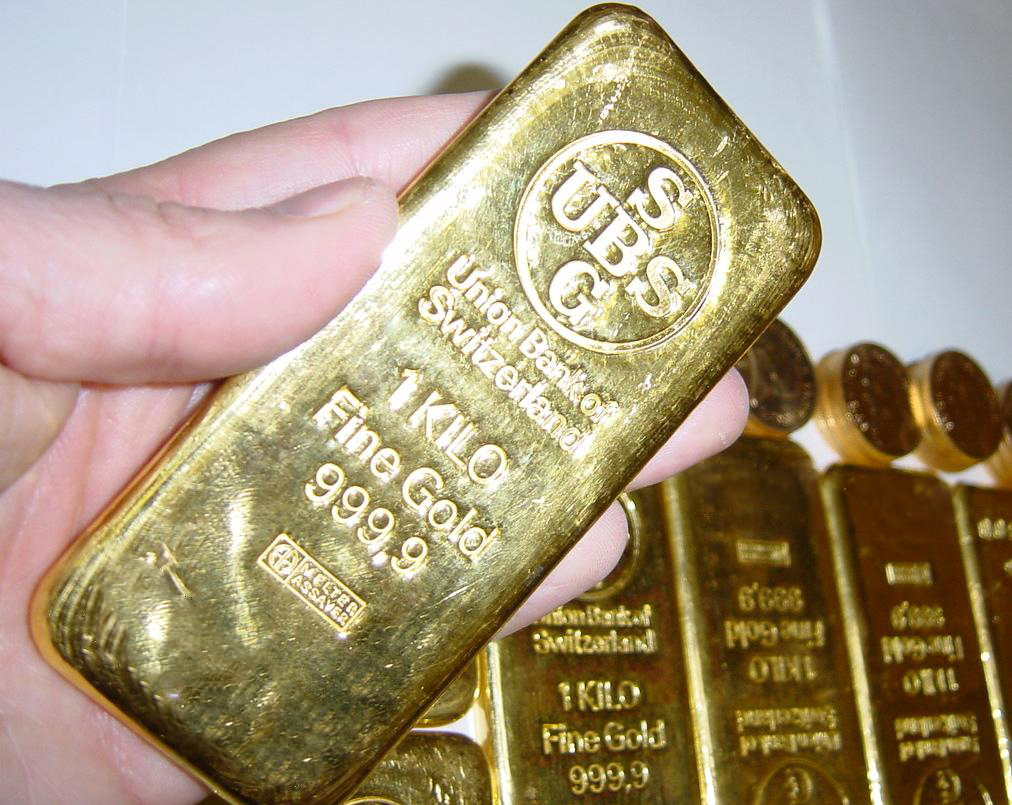
Use of a gold ingot as a "gold key" has been used as a plot device. (Serial numbers obscured in altered photo.)

In fiction, a gold key is a special token granting access to and control of a mythical or ultra-private or secret bank account or vault, such as a Swiss bank account. In reality, the key is often a code word and accounts are not completely anonymous. A real "gold key" need not be made of or colored gold, or even a key. If it is a key it may not fit any lock; the keys are important as authentication tokens, not always as literal keys.

While Swiss law formerly granted nearly complete financial privacy, fully anonymous accounts are no longer available. Swiss banks are now required by law to obtain identifying information from any prospective clients. International pressure related to efforts to trace and identify terrorists and drug traffickers has eliminated the anonymous "Swiss bank account" that has appeared in numerous books and films and conspiracy theories. Other countries still offer offshore bank accounts with varying degrees of anonymity in transactions.

The arrival of a "gold key client" typically results in an extra flurry of attention. A number of plot devices detail the method of authentication of the account-holder, adding to the mystery and drama of the client's arrival. It is a common literary device that banks do not admit publicly that "gold key" accounts actually exist, and characters are therefore invested into a sort of secret society when they are offered such an account.

== Literary references ==
In the best-selling novel The Da Vinci Code, the heroine Sophie Neveu is given a gold key by her grandfather. The gold key bears the logo of the Priory of Sion, a secret society, which leads Neveu and co-hero Robert Langdon to guess the code associated with the key.

In Lewis Perdue's Daughter of God there is a gold key which is hidden in a painting ("The Home of the Lady of Our Redeemer"). This gold key (accompanied by a gold ingot with the account number) allows access to a safe deposit box in a Zurich bank. The key does not actually open a lock as such.

In the Harry Potter novels by J.K. Rowling, the wizarding bank Gringotts uses gold keys, among other devices, to protect the security of its vaults which contain wizards' gold hoards.
