= Dmitri the Astronaut =

1996 children's book

- Author: Jon Agee
- Illustrator: Jon Agee
- Language: English
- Genre: Children's
- Publisher: HarperCollins Publishers
- Publication date: 1996
- Publication place: United States
- ISBN: 0-06-205074-5

Dmitri the Astronaut is a 1996 children's book written and illustrated by Jon Agee. The book follows an astronaut named Dmitri who returns to Earth after two and a half years on the moon to find that no one remembers him.

== Plot ==
An American astronaut named Dmitri splashes down in the Atlantic Ocean after spending two and a half years on the Moon. He is picked up by the cruise ship S.S. Knickerbocker and sails to New York City, but quickly realizes that no one remembers him. Dmitri visits the Museum of Intergalactic Exploration, where he is so discouraged by the neglected state of the museum's Moon exhibit that he tosses his collection of Moon rocks into a trash can in Central Park. Dmitri does not know that his friend Lulu, a small pink creature he found on the Moon, hid inside the bag of rocks before Dmitri took off for Earth. Dr. Geoffrey W. Beaton, a Nobel Prize-winning scientist, finds Lulu in the park and takes the creature to the Academy of Science. The following day, Dmitri finds Lulu at the Academy, where the creature has covered the walls with crayon drawings of Dmitri in his space suit. Dmitri is finally recognized by Dr. Beaton, and Dmitri and Lulu are hailed as heroes.

== Reception ==
Kirkus Reviews called Dmitri the Astronaut an "utterly engaging tale of interplanetary friendship." According to Publishers Weekly, "The wry humor of Agee's clever book springs in equal measure from the minimal, tongue-in-cheek text and adroitly exaggerated cartoon illustrations." Carolyn Phelan wrote in Booklist, "Older children may point out a few flaws in the story, but preschoolers will find this a beguiling picture book, memorable for its expressive illustrations and the convincing innocence and mutual affection of the two main characters." Writing for School Library Journal, Anne Connor said, "The gentle story of a friendship across planetary boundaries has a whimsical appeal for Agee's adult fans, but lacks the conflict or strong narrative line to involve children."
