= Runny Babbit =

Book by Shel Silverstein

Runny Babbit: A Billy Sook
- Cover
- Author: Shel Silverstein
- Language: English
- Genre: Children's literature
- Publisher: HarperCollins
- Publication date: March 15, 2005
- Publication place: United States
- Pages: 96
- ISBN: 0060256532

Runny Babbit: A Billy Sook is a children's book by Shel Silverstein. A work in progress for the better part of 20 years, the book was published posthumously in March 2005. The book is largely composed of spoonerisms in rhyming verse.

== Plot ==
Other than speaking only in spoonerisms, Runny is a normal child. He has many friends, and two loving parents, his "Dummy and Mad," who often remind him to "Shake a tower," "Dash the wishes," "Trush your beeth," "Rean up your cloom," and other chores.
