= David Lynn Golemon =

American novelist

David Lynn Golemon (David L. Golemon) is the author of paranormal thriller novels, notably the Event Group Thrillers.

In Event, the first book in the Event Group series, Major Jack Collins is drafted into the covert Event Group and investigates a UFO incident seemingly related to the Roswell UFO incident. The books often involve famous events and people from history, such as Jack the Ripper and Czar Nicholas II.

Golemon's book Legend was a New York Times best seller.

== Books ==
=== Event Group series ===
1. Event, St. Martin's Press, 2006
2. Legend, St. Martin's Press, 2007
3. Ancients, St. Martin's Press, 2008
4. Leviathan, St. Martin's Press, 2009
5. Primeval, St. Martin's Press, 2010
6. Legacy, St. Martin's Press, 2011
7. Ripper, St. Martin's Press, 2012
8. Carpathian, St. Martin's Press, 2013
9. Overlord, St. Martin's Press, 2014
10. The Mountain, St. Martin's Press, 2015
11. The Traveler, St. Martin's Press, 2016
12. Beyond the Sea, St. Martin's Press, 2017
13. Empire of the Dragon, Quoth Publications, 2018
14. Season of the Witch, Quoth Publications, 2019
15. Master of the World TBA

=== The Supernaturals ===
1. The Supernaturals: A Ghost Story, Seven Realms Publishing, 2011
2. In the Still of the Night, St. Martin's Press, 2017
