= 20,000 Leagues Under the Sea (1985 film) =

1985 film

- Written by: Stephen MacLean, Jules Verne (original author)
- Starring: Tom Burlinson
- Music by: John Stuart
- Country of origin: Australia
- Original language: English

Production
- Producer: Tim Brooke-Hunt
- Editors: Peter Jennings, Caroline Neave
- Running time: 50 minutes

Original release
- Release: 17 December 1985

20,000 Leagues Under the Sea is a 1985 Australian made-for-television animated film from Burbank Films Australia. The film is based on Jules Verne's classic 1870 novel, Twenty Thousand Leagues Under the Seas, and was adapted by Stephen MacLean.

== Plot ==
In 1866, a mysterious sea monster is hunting the depths of the oceans and rising only to attack and destroy innocent ships at a cost of many lives. Experts around the world are trying to discover the identity of the monster and possibly destroy it before even more lives are lost. Marine expert Professor Pierre Aronnax, his faithful companion Conseil and harpoonist Ned Land, set out aboard the Abraham Lincoln from Long Island in search of said monster. The monster attacks, and the three companions are thrown overboard and the ship's crew declares them lost. Their lives are saved as they are held above water by the monster, which they discover to be a modern submarine, named the Nautilus. Inside, they meet the submarine's captain, Captain Nemo, and his faithful crew.

To keep his secret safe, Captain Nemo keeps the three men aboard his ship. Aboard the Nautilus, the professor, Ned and Conseil travel throughout the depths of the ocean, a voyage the professor and Conseil find fascinating, but Ned soon finds his captivity unbearable and develops a hatred for the captain and a longing for freedom. The professor learns of Captain Nemo's hatred towards mankind, for he had lost his wife, children and family to them, and now sought revenge by destroying as many ships as he encountered. On the other hand, Captain Nemo has a great respect toward his men as well as the oceans of the world and their creatures. At the beginning of the voyage, the Nautilus is attacked by a giant squid that grabs Nemo but is killed by Ned. In the waters off India, Nemo saves a pearl-diver from a hungry shark and gives her a pearl. He then prevents Ned from killing a dugong. Ned, the professor, and Conseil escape the Nautilus by rowing to a tropical island but are chased back to the Nautilus by natives, whom Nemo scares away with electricity. When a life is lost aboard the submarine, Nemo takes the body for burial in the lost continent of Atlantis to rest forever underwater, but Ned is chased by giant crabs. Spying inside the captain's private chamber, the professor, Conseil and Ned discover Nemo's plan of travelling to the seas of Norway, where he will have the ultimate revenge by destroying the ship responsible for the loss of those dear to him.

The three companions try unsuccessfully to bring Nemo to reason, but he determined even at the risk of his life. Wanting no part in the calamity, the three men take a chance to escape in a rowboat, and wanting to warn the to-be-victimized ship, are thrown ashore by the ocean waves. Finding rest and shelter on an uninhabited island, the professor is happy to have kept his journal safe, so he may tell the world of their adventures. No one learns about the fate of the Nautilus and Captain Nemo, who may have perished or still be alive seeking revenge on mankind.

== Cast ==
- Tom Burlinson as Ned Land
- Colin Borgonon as Captain Nemo
- Paul Woodson
- Liz Horne
- Alistair Duncan
- Gilbert Christian

== Production ==
It was produced by Tim Brooke-Hunt and featured original music by John Stuart. The copyright in this film is now owned by Pulse Distribution and Entertainment and administered by digital rights management firm NuTech Digital.

== See also ==
- List of underwater science fiction works
