= "Weird Al" Yankovic videography =

A list of music videos by American musician, singer and record producer "Weird Al" Yankovic.

== Music videos ==
List of music videos, showing year released and directors
Year	Title	Director(s)	Notes
1983	"Ricky"	Janet Greek	Parody of "Mickey" by Toni Basil
1983	"I Love Rocky Road"	Dror Soref	Parody of "I Love Rock 'n' Roll" by Joan Jett and the Blackhearts
1984	"Eat It"	Jay Levey	Parody of "Beat It" by Michael Jackson
1984	"I Lost on Jeopardy"	Francis Delia	Parody of "Jeopardy" by the Greg Kihn Band
1984	"This Is the Life"	Jay Levey, Robert K. Weiss	Original song.
1985	"Like a Surgeon"	Jay Levey, Robert K. Weiss	Parody of "Like a Virgin" by Madonna
1985	"Dare to Be Stupid"	Jay Levey, Robert K. Weiss	Style parody of Devo
1985	"One More Minute"	Jay Levey, Robert K. Weiss	Original song.
1986	"Living with a Hernia"	Jay Levey	Parody of "Living in America" by James Brown
1986	"Christmas at Ground Zero"	Al Yankovic	Original song.
1988	"Fat"	Jay Levey	Parody of "Bad" by Michael Jackson
1989	"Money for Nothing/Beverly Hillbillies"	Jay Levey	Parody of "Money for Nothing" by Dire Straits
1989	"UHF"	Jay Levey	Original song, lead single on the soundtrack for "Weird Al"'s feature film UHF
1992	"Smells Like Nirvana"	Jay Levey	Parody of "Smells Like Teen Spirit" by Nirvana
1992	"You Don't Love Me Anymore"	Jay Levey	Original song.
1993	"Jurassic Park"	Mark Osborne, Scott Nordlund	Parody of "MacArthur Park" by Richard Harris
1993	"Bedrock Anthem"	Al Yankovic	Parody of "Under the Bridge" and "Give It Away" by Red Hot Chili Peppers
1994	"Headline News"	Al Yankovic	Parody of "Mmm Mmm Mmm Mmm" by Crash Test Dummies
1996	"Amish Paradise"	Al Yankovic	Parody of "Gangsta's Paradise" by Coolio
1996	"Gump"	Al Yankovic	Parody of "Lump" by The Presidents of the United States of America
1996	"Spy Hard"	Al Yankovic	Original song. Theme to the movie Spy Hard
1999	"The Saga Begins"	Al Yankovic	Parody of "American Pie" by Don McLean
1999	"It's All About the Pentiums"	Al Yankovic	Parody of "It's All About the Benjamins" by Sean "Puff Daddy" Combs
2003	"Bob"	Al Yankovic	Style parody of Bob Dylan
2006	"Don't Download This Song"	Bill Plympton	Style parody of charity songs, such as "We Are the World" and "Hands Across America"
2006	"I'll Sue Ya"	Thomas Lee	Style parody of Rage Against the Machine
2006	"Virus Alert"	David C. Lovelace	Style parody of Sparks
2006	"Close but No Cigar"	John Kricfalusi	Style parody of Cake
2006	"Pancreas"	Jim Blashfield	Style parody of Brian Wilson
2006	"Weasel Stomping Day"	Robot Chicken	Style parody of animated musical specials of the 1960s
2006	"White & Nerdy"	Al Yankovic	Parody of "Ridin'" by Chamillionaire
2006	"Do I Creep You Out"	Evan Spiridellis	Parody of "Do I Make You Proud" by Taylor Hicks
2007	"Trapped in the Drive-Thru"	Doug Bresler	Parody of "Trapped in the Closet" by R. Kelly
2009	"Craigslist"	Liam Lynch	Style parody of The Doors
2009	"Skipper Dan"	Divya Srinivasan	Style parody of Weezer
2009	"CNR"	Gregg Spiridellis, Evan Spiridellis	Style parody of The White Stripes
2009	"Ringtone"	Josh Faure-Brac, Dustin McLean	Style parody of Queen
2011	"TMZ"	Bill Plympton	Parody of "You Belong with Me" by Taylor Swift
2011	"Party in the CIA"	Roque Ballesteros	Parody of "Party in the U.S.A." by Miley Cyrus
2011	"Another Tattoo"	Augenblick Studios	Parody of "Nothin' on You" by B.o.B
2011	"If That Isn't Love"	Brian Frisk	Style parody of Hanson
2011	"Whatever You Like"	Cris Shapan	Parody of "Whatever You Like" by T.I.
2011	"Stop Forwarding That Crap to Me"	Koos Dekker	Style parody of Jim Steinman
2011	"Perform This Way"	Al Yankovic	Parody of "Born This Way" by Lady Gaga
2011	"Polka Face"	Melanie Mandl (Liechtensteiner Polka & Tick Tock Polka David Wachtenheim (Polka Face, Right Round, Baby, Break Your Heart, I Kissed A Girl) Phillip Eddolls (Womanizer) John R Dilworth (Day 'n' Nite) Dan Meth (TiK ToK and Blame It) Greg Holfeld (Down) Anna Bermann (Fireflies) Etcetera.	A polka medley, and a parody of "Poker Face" by Lady Gaga
2014	"Tacky"	Al Yankovic	Parody of "Happy" by Pharrell Williams
2014	"Word Crimes"	Jarrett Heather	Parody of "Blurred Lines" by Robin Thicke
2014	"Foil"	Al Yankovic	Parody of "Royals" by Lorde
2014	"Handy"	Al Yankovic	Parody of "Fancy" by Iggy Azalea
2014	"Sports Song"	Al Yankovic, Andrew Bush	Style parody of U.S. college football fight songs
2014	"First World Problems"	Liam Lynch	Style parody of Pixies
2014	"Lame Claim to Fame"	Tim Thompson	Style parody of Southern Culture on the Skids
2014	"Mission Statement"	TruScribe	Style parody of Crosby, Stills & Nash
2016	"Bad Hombres, Nasty Women"	Michael Gregory	Moderator of a parody of the third presidential debate for the 2016 elections in the U.S. with Donald Trump and Hillary Clinton.
2020	"Weird Al Presents: 'America Is Doomed, the Musical'"	Michael Gregory	Moderator of a parody of the first presidential debate for the 2020 elections in the U.S. with Donald Trump and Joe Biden.

== Awards and nominations ==
Award	Year	Title	Category	Ref
Grammy Awards wins	1988	"Fat"	Best Concept Music Video	
Grammy Awards nominations	1994	"Jurassic Park"	Best Music Video, Short Form	
Grammy Awards nominations	2011	"Perform This Way"	Best Music Video, Short Form	
Australian gold long form videos		The Ultimate Video Collection		
U.S. gold long form videos	1993	The "Weird Al" Yankovic Video Library	1993	
U.S. gold long form videos		Alapalooza: The Videos		
U.S. gold long form videos		"Weird Al" Yankovic Live!		
U.S. gold long form videos		Bad Hair Day: The Videos		
U.S. platinum long form videos		The Ultimate Video Collection		

== See also ==
- "Weird Al" Yankovic: The Videos
- "Weird Al" Yankovic: The Ultimate Video Collection

== Sources ==
- Rabin, Nathan; Yankovic, Al (2012). Weird Al: The Book. New York: Abrams Books. ISBN 978-1419704352.
