= The Mandatory World Tour =

2015–16 concert tour by "Weird Al" Yankovic

- Tour by "Weird Al" Yankovic
- Promotional poster for the tour
- Location: Asia; Europe; North America; Oceania
- Associated album: Mandatory Fun
- Start date: May 12, 2015
- End date: September 24, 2016
- Legs: 4
- No. of shows: 198

"Weird Al" Yankovic concert chronology
- The Alpocalypse Tour (2011–2013); The Mandatory World Tour (2015–2016); The Ridiculously Self-Indulgent, Ill-Advised Vanity Tour (2018)

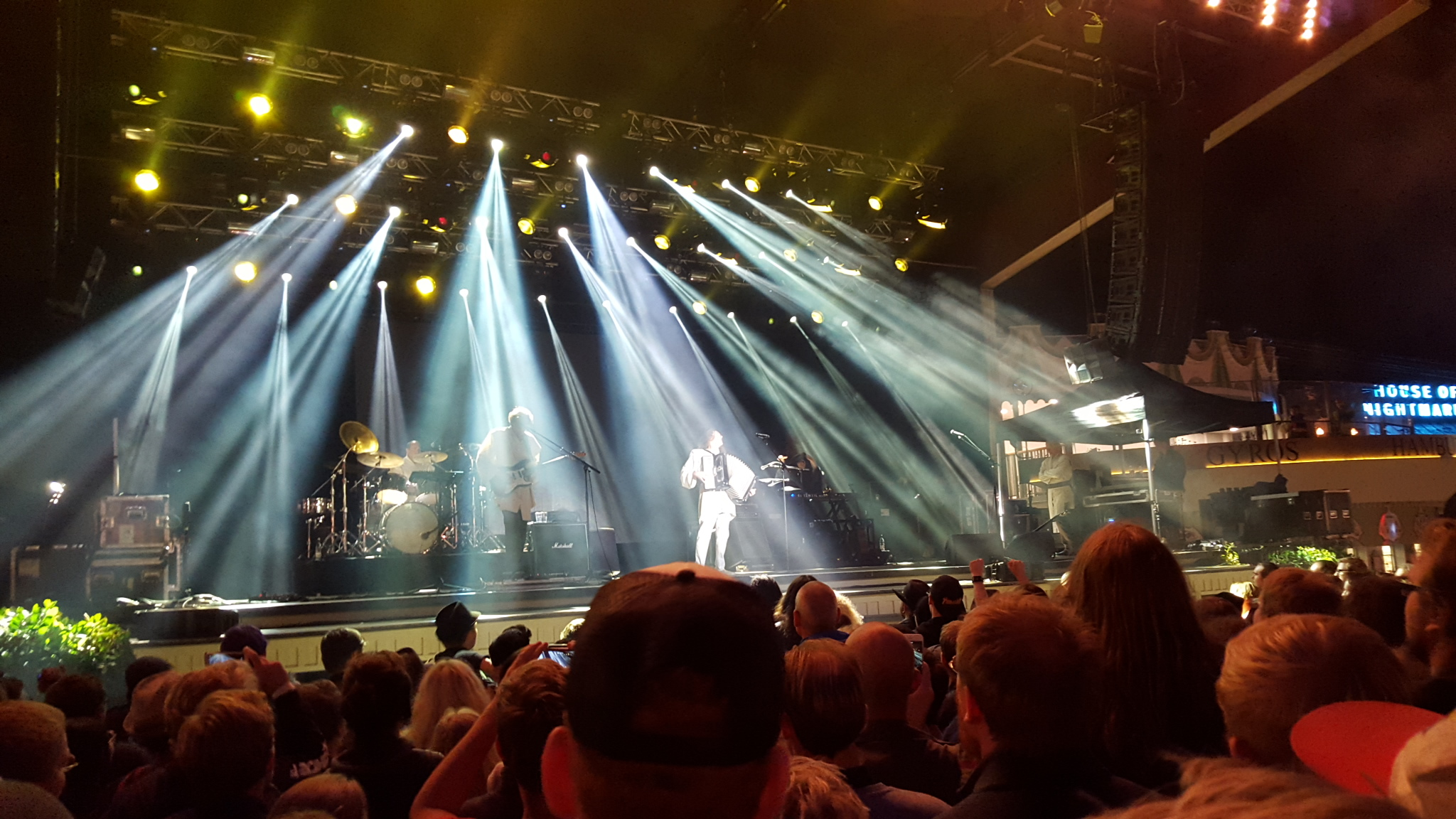
Concert at Gröna Lund in Stockholm, Sweden

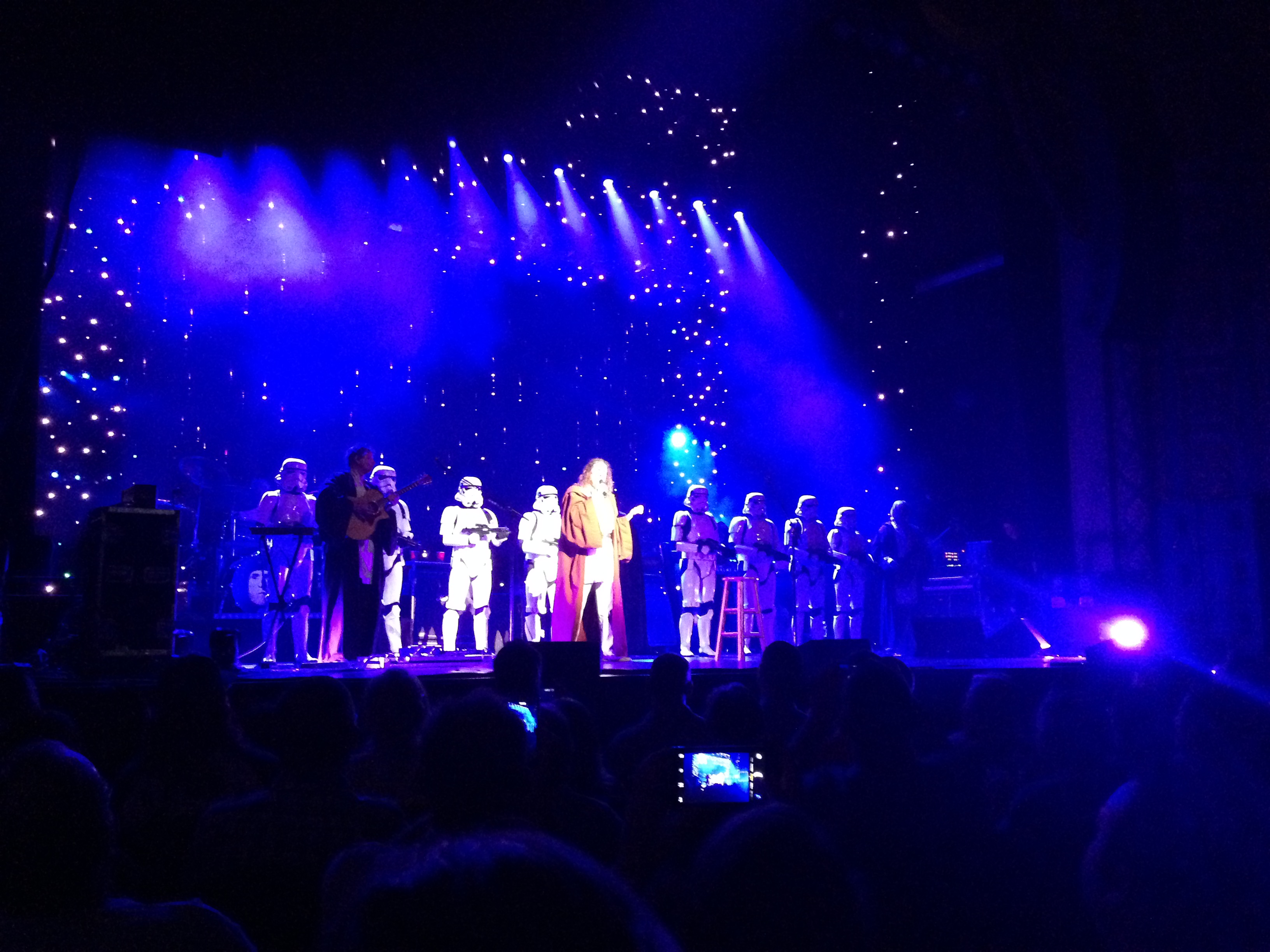
Concert at Florida Theatre in Jacksonville, Florida

The Mandatory World Tour (renamed The Return of the Mandatory World Tour in later legs) was the 12th concert tour by American recording artist "Weird Al" Yankovic. Launched in 2015, the tour supports the singer's 14th studio album, Mandatory Fun (2014). Running for two years, the tour played nearly 200 shows in North America, Europe and Australasia.

== Background ==
Yankovic announced the tour in January 2015 via his Twitter account. The tweet featured a 30-second ad, styled as a propaganda film, calling the show, "the greatest musical spectacle ever seen". The tour predominately played in the United States, with a handful of dates in Canada, Europe, Australia and New Zealand. Along with standalone gigs, Yankovic also played music festivals, state and county fairs. At the end of 2015, the tour placed 122nd on Pollstar's annual year end list, earning 8.2 million. In 2016, the singer added additional shows marked as the "Return of the Mandatory World Tour". Yankovic remarked many fans were upset that he did not play certain territories, stating: "They forgot the show was mandatory". The shows in 2016 placed 159th on Pollstar's annual year end list, making $7.1 million, bringing the total earned to $15.3 million.

== Critical reception ==
Along with its commercial success, the tour received praise from critics and spectators of the concerts.

In Cary, David Menconi (The News & Observer) stated Yankovic makes being funny look easy. He says: "People still turn out for Yankovic because he's incredibly skilled at crafting cultural time-capsules starring himself. He's also about the last word in appealing adolescent silliness; my 16-year-old son came along, and he loved it."

Ashley Belanger (Orlando Weekly) writes Yankovic was a great showman despite the humorous material. For the show in Orlando, she wrote: "'Weird Al' was a live wire. I found my eyes flitting around to follow his every move, like I was a freaking cat watching a laser pointer. Not only did he do costume changes nearly every song, but his whole band played along by switching get-ups too, with enough change-ups to wonder if backstage looked like a teen girl's bedroom with cast-off garments covering every surface."

The show in London received three out of five stars. Brian Logan (The Guardian) writes: "The experience is more akin to watching a tribute band, where the homage being paid is tongue-in-cheek, if scarcely less affectionate, and the source material extends to every major pop song since the early 80s. Highlights include a swing version of Yankovic's breakout Michael Jackson pastiche Eat It, and his Star Wars/Don McLean mashup The Saga Begins, replete with stormtroopers. Throughout, Yankovic's voice is strong, whether he's aping Kurt Cobain or crooning barbershop with his excellent band. The personal touch is lacking, but there's no denying, Weird Al gives good show."

Cory Garcia (Houston Press) writes the show was given a different vibe in the Brown Theatre. He says: "The surroundings made the show feel bigger physically and on a metaphorical level. It feels weird to label what Weird Al does live as a concert because it feels much more than that. Over his career, Weird Al Yankovic has earned his place in fancy theater venues; yes, his art may be writing food-centric parodies of pop songs, but he is the Shakespeare of that art. So, maybe I've had it backward before; it's not that Al is worthy of playing the Wortham; it's that the Wortham is worthy of hosting Al."

Danny Gallagher (Dallas Observer) stated the show at the Winspear Opera House was a repeat success of the show in October 2015. He goes on to say: "The focus of his show is on the music, even if he's performing purely for laughs. It's a tightly constructed and executed set list that not only included multiple instruments and heavy multimedia interaction but also wardrobe changes and even some special prosthetic makeup."

== Setlist ==
The following setlist was obtained from the concert held on May 15, 2015, at the PH Showroom in Las Vegas, Nevada. It does not represent all concerts for the duration of the tour.

1. "Tacky"
2. "Lame Claim to Fame"
3. "NOW That's What I Call Polka!"
4. "Perform This Way"
5. "Dare To Be Stupid"
6. "Fat"
7. "First World Problems"
8. "Foil"
9. "Smells Like Nirvana"
10. "Party In The CIA" / "It's All About The Pentiums" / "Handy" / "Bedrock Anthem" / "Another One Rides the Bus" / "Ode to a Superhero" / "Gump" / "Inactive" / "eBay" / "Canadian Idiot"
11. "Wanna B Ur Lovr"
12. "Eat It" / "I Lost on Jeopardy" / "I Love Rocky Road" / "Like a Surgeon"
13. "White & Nerdy"
14. "Word Crimes"
15. "Amish Paradise"

Encore

16. "The Saga Begins"
17. "Yoda"

== Tour dates ==
Date	City	Country	Venue
North America
May 12, 2015	Las Vegas	United States	PH Showroom
May 13, 2015	Las Vegas	United States	PH Showroom
May 14, 2015	Las Vegas	United States	PH Showroom
May 15, 2015	Las Vegas	United States	PH Showroom
May 16, 2015	Las Vegas	United States	PH Showroom
May 19, 2015	Tulsa	United States	Brady Theater
May 20, 2015	Oklahoma City	United States	Hudson Performance Hall
May 22, 2015	Biloxi	United States	Hard Rock Live
May 23, 2015	Nashville	United States	Ryman Auditorium
May 24, 2015	Tunica Resorts	United States	Bluesville Showcase Nightclub
May 26, 2015	Bloomington	United States	Bloomington Center for the Performing Arts
May 28, 2015	Indianapolis	United States	Murat Theatre
May 29, 2015	Mount Pleasant	United States	The Entertainment Hall
May 30, 2015	Cleveland	United States	Jacobs Pavilion
May 31, 2015	Greensburg	United States	Palace Theatre
June 2, 2015	Boston	United States	Wilbur Theatre
June 3, 2015	Boston	United States	Wilbur Theatre
June 4, 2015	Concord	United States	Chubb Theatre
June 6, 2015	Ledyard	United States	Fox Theater
June 7, 2015^{[A]}	New York City	United States	Randall's Island
June 8, 2015	Lancaster	United States	American Music Theatre
June 11, 2015	Richmond	United States	Carpenter Theater
June 12, 2015	Wolf Trap	United States	Filene Center
June 13, 2015	Baltimore	United States	Pier Six Pavilion
June 14, 2015	Roanoke	United States	Berglund Performing Arts Theater
June 16, 2015	Bethlehem	United States	Sands Bethlehem Event Center
June 18, 2015	Cary	United States	Koka Booth Amphitheatre
June 19, 2015	Charlotte	United States	Ovens Auditorium
June 20, 2015	Atlanta	United States	Delta Classic Chastain Park Amphitheater
June 21, 2015	Kettering	United States	Fraze Pavilion
June 23, 2015	Newark	United States	Midland Theatre, Newark, Ohio
June 24, 2015	Louisville	United States	Palace Theatre
June 26, 2015	Windsor	Canada	The Colosseum at Caesars Windsor
June 27, 2015	Chicago	United States	Chicago Theatre
June 28, 2015	St. Louis	United States	Peabody Opera House
June 30, 2015	Kansas City	United States	Arvest Bank Theatre
July 1, 2015	Wichita	United States	Orpheum Theatre
July 2, 2015	Council Bluff	United States	Stir Concert Cove
July 3, 2015	Prior Lake	United States	Mystic Showroom
July 4, 2015^{[B]}	Milwaukee	United States	BMO Harris Pavilion
July 5, 2015^{[C]}	Traverse City	United States	Pepsi Bay Side Music Stage
July 7, 2015	Bowling Green	United States	Southern Kentucky Performing Arts Center
July 8, 2015	Greenville	United States	Peace Concert Hall
July 10, 2015	Erie	United States	Warner Theatre
July 11, 2015	Albany	United States	Palace Theatre
July 12, 2015	Burlington	United States	Flynn Center for the Performing Arts
July 14, 2015	Verona	United States	Turning Stone Showroom
July 15, 2015	Buffalo	United States	Center for the Arts
July 17, 2015	Hamilton	Canada	Hamilton Place Theatre
July 18, 2015	Rama	Canada	Casino Rama Entertainment Centre
July 19, 2015^{[D]}	Ottawa	Canada	LeBreton Flats Park
July 20, 2015	London	Canada	Centennial Hall
July 21, 2015^{[E]}	Montreal	Canada	Place des Festivals
July 23, 2015	Halifax	Canada	Schooner Showroom
July 24, 2015	Halifax	Canada	Schooner Showroom
July 25, 2015	Moncton	Canada	The Centre
July 26, 2015^{[F]}	Portland	United States	Maine State Pier
July 28, 2015	Red Bank	United States	Count Basie Theatre
July 30, 2015	Port Chester	United States	Capitol Theatre
July 31, 2015	Philadelphia	United States	Mann Center for the Performing Arts
August 1, 2015	Huntington	United States	Paramount Theatre
August 2, 2015	Morristown	United States	Mayo Performing Arts Center
August 4, 2015	New Bedford	United States	Zeiterion Performing Arts Center
August 5, 2015	Williamsport	United States	Community Arts Center
August 7, 2015	Knoxville	United States	Tennessee Theatre
August 8, 2015	Newport News	United States	Diamonstein Concert Hall
August 9, 2015	North Charleston	United States	North Charleston Performing Arts Center
August 11, 2015	Orlando	United States	Hard Rock Live
August 13, 2015	Clearwater	United States	Ruth Eckerd Hall
August 14, 2015	Melbourne	United States	King Center for the Performing Arts
August 15, 2015	Fort Lauderdale	United States	Au-Rene Theater
August 16, 2015	Jacksonville	United States	Florida Theatre
August 18, 2015	Houston	United States	Bayou Music Center
August 19, 2015	San Antonio	United States	Majestic Theatre
August 20, 2015	Austin	United States	Moody Theater
August 21, 2015	Grand Prairie	United States	Verizon Theatre at Grand Prairie
August 23, 2015	Denver	United States	Paramount Theatre
August 24, 2015	Sandy	United States	Sandy Amphitheater
August 26, 2015	Tucson	United States	Anselmo Valencia Tori Amphitheater
August 28, 2015^{[G]}	Del Mar	United States	Del Mar racetrack
August 29, 2015	San Francisco	United States	SF Masonic Auditorium
August 30, 2015	Folsom	United States	Harris Center
August 31, 2015	Folsom	United States	Harris Center
September 1, 2015	Arcata	United States	Van Duzer Theatre
September 2, 2015^{[H]}	Jacksonville	United States	Britt Pavilion
September 4, 2015	Bend	United States	Les Schwab Amphitheater
September 5, 2015	Portland	United States	Oregon Zoo Amphitheater
September 6, 2015	Portland	United States	Oregon Zoo Amphitheater
September 8, 2015	Vancouver	Canada	Queen Elizabeth Theatre
September 9, 2015	Penticton	Canada	South Okanagan Events Centre
September 11, 2015	Edmonton	Canada	Northern Alberta Jubilee Auditorium
September 12, 2015	Calgary	Canada	Southern Alberta Jubilee Auditorium
September 13, 2015	Airway Heights	United States	Pend Oreille Pavilion
September 14, 2015^{[I]}	Puyallup	United States	WSF Events Center Grandstand
September 16, 2015	Modesto	United States	Rogers Theater
September 18, 2015	Laughlin	United States	Rio Vista Outdoor Amphitheater
September 19, 2015	Los Angeles	United States	Greek Theatre
Europe
September 24, 2015	Stockholm	Sweden	Stora Scen
September 25, 2015	Oslo	Norway	Sentrum Scene
September 26, 2015	Trondheim	Norway	Cosmos
September 28, 2015	Copenhagen	Denmark	Vega, Copenhagen
September 30, 2015	Amsterdam	Netherlands	Melkweg
October 1, 2015	Brussels	Belgium	Ancienne Belgique
October 3, 2015	Solihull	England	National Exhibition Centre
October 4, 2015	London	England	Eventim Apollo
October 6, 2015	Dublin	Ireland	Vicar Street
October 6, 2015	Belfast	Northern Ireland	Limelight
October 6, 2015	Glasgow	Scotland	O_{2} ABC
Australia
December 28, 2015^{[J]}	Waurn Ponds	Australia	Mt Duneed Estate
December 31, 2015^{[J]}	Byron Bay	Australia	North Byron Parklands
January 2, 2016	Sydney	Australia	Enmore Theatre
January 3, 2016	Melbourne	Australia	Palais Theatre
January 6, 2016	Christchurch	New Zealand	Isaac Theatre Royal
January 8, 2016	Adelaide	Australia	Thebarton Theatre
North America
June 3, 2016	St. Petersburg	United States	Mahaffey Theater
June 4, 2016	West Palm Beach	United States	Dreyfoos Hall
June 5, 2016	Fort Myers	United States	Mann Performing Arts Center
June 7, 2016	Mobile	United States	Saenger Theatre
June 9, 2016	Lakeland	United States	Youkey Theatre
June 10, 2016	Miami	United States	Ziff Ballet Opera House
June 11, 2016	St. Augustine	United States	St. Augustine Amphitheatre
June 12, 2016	Birmingham	United States	BJCC Concert Hall
June 15, 2016	Louisville	United States	Iroquois Amphitheater
June 16, 2016	Nashville	United States	Grand Ole Opry House
June 17, 2016	Huntsville	United States	Smith Concert Hall
June 18, 2016	Greensboro	United States	White Oak Amphitheatre
June 19, 2016	Atlanta	United States	Fox Theatre
June 21, 2016	Portsmouth	United States	nTelos Pavilion
June 22, 2016	Baltimore	United States	Hippodrome Theatre
June 24, 2016	Akron	United States	Akron Civic Theatre
June 25, 2016^{[K]}	Bay City	United States	Veterans Memorial Park
June 26, 2016	Fort Wayne	United States	Foellinger Theatre
June 28, 2016	Evansville	United States	Victory Theatre
June 28, 2016^{[B]}	Milwaukee	United States	Uline Warehouse
July 1, 2016	Toledo	United States	Toledo Zoo Amphitheater
July 2, 2016	Aurora	United States	Dunham Pavilion
July 3, 2016	Merrillville	United States	Star Plaza Theatre
July 6, 2016	Columbus	United States	Palace Theatre
July 7, 2016	Indianapolis	United States	Farmer's Bureau Insurance Lawn
July 8, 2016	Cincinnati	United States	PNC Pavilion
July 9, 2016	Chattanooga	United States	Tivoli Theatre
July 10, 2016	Southaven	United States	Snowden Grove Amphitheater
July 12, 2016	Austin	United States	Bass Concert Hall
July 14, 2016	Houston	United States	Brown Theatre
July 15, 2016	Bilox	United States	Hard Rock Live
July 16, 2016	Dallas	United States	Winspear Opera House
July 17, 2016	Enid	United States	Central National Bank Center
July 19, 2016	El Paso	United States	Kidd Performance Hall
July 21, 2016	San Diego	United States	CalCoast Credit Union Open Air Theatre
July 22, 2016	Los Angeles	United States	Hollywood Bowl
July 23, 2016	Los Angeles	United States	Hollywood Bowl
July 24, 2016	San Jose	United States	City National Civic
July 26, 2016^{[L]}	Seattle	United States	North Meadow
July 27, 2016	Seattle	United States	North Meadow
July 28, 2016	Troutdale	United States	McMenamins Edgefield Amphitheater
July 29, 2016	Eugene	United States	Cuthbert Amphitheater
July 30, 2016	Rohnert Park	United States	Green Music Center
August 2, 2016	Santa Barbara	United States	Arlington Theater
August 3, 2016	Phoenix	United States	Comerica Theatre
August 5, 2016^{[M]}	Salt Lake City	United States	Red Butte Garden Amphitheatre
August 6, 2016	Littleton	United States	Hudson Gardens & Event Center
August 7, 2016	Kansas City	United States	Starlight Theatre
August 9, 2016	Cedar Rapids	United States	McGrath Amphitheatre
August 10, 2016	Lincoln	United States	Pinewood Bowl Theater
August 12, 2016	Moorhead	United States	Bluestem Amphitheater
August 13, 2016^{[N]}	Sturgis	United States	Buffalo Chip Campground
August 14, 2016	Regina	Canada	Conexus Arts Centre
August 15, 2016	Winnipeg	Canada	Burton Cummings Theatre
August 18, 2016	Thunder Bay	Canada	Thunder Bay Community Auditorium
August 19, 2016	Minneapolis	United States	State Theatre
August 20, 2016	Appleton	United States	Thrivent Financial Hall
August 21, 2016	Madison	United States	Overture Hall
August 23, 2016	Rockford	United States	Coronado Theatre
August 24, 2016	Paducah	United States	Carson Center
August 26, 2016	Grand Rapids	United States	DeVos Performance Hall
August 27, 2016	Sterling Heights	United States	Freedom Hill Amphitheater
August 28, 2016	Huber Heights	United States	Rose Music Center
August 30, 2016	Wilmington	United States	Playhouse Theatre
September 1, 2016^{[O]}	Lowell	United States	Boarding House Park
September 2, 2016	Gilford	United States	Bank of New Hampshire Pavilion
September 3, 2016	Canandaigua	United States	CM Performing Arts Center
September 4, 2016	Big Flats	United States	Budweiser Summer Stage
September 7, 2016	Columbia	United States	Koger Center for the Arts
September 8, 2016	Wilmington	United States	Wilson Center
September 9, 2016	Durham	United States	Durham Performing Arts Center
September 10, 2016	Asheville	United States	Wolfe Auditorium
September 11, 2016	Vienna	United States	Filene Center
September 13, 2016	Hershey	United States	Hershey Theatre
September 14, 2016	Providence	United States	Providence Performing Arts Center
September 16, 2016	Pittsburgh	United States	Benedum Center
September 17, 2016	Schenectady	United States	Proctor's Theatre
September 18, 2016	Waterbury	United States	Palace Theater
September 20, 2016	Bethlehem	United States	Sands Bethlehem Event Center
September 22, 2016	Charleston	United States	Clay Center
September 23, 2016	Atlantic City	United States	Circus Maximus Theater
September 24, 2016	New York City	United States	Radio City Music Hall

Festivals and other miscellaneous performances

^{A} This concert was a part of the "Governors Ball Music Festival"
^{B} This concert was a part of "Summerfest"
^{C} This concert was a part of the "National Cherry Festival"
^{D} This concert was a part of the "RBC Royal Bank Ottawa Bluesfest"
^{E} This concert was a part of "Just for Laughs"
^{F} This concert was a part of the "Machias Savings Bank Concert Series"
^{G} This concert was a part of the "Del Mar Summer Concert Series"
^{H} This concert was a part of the "Britt Music and Arts Festival"
^{I} This concert was a part of the "Columbia Bank Concert Series"
^{J} This concert was a part of the "Falls Music & Arts Festival"
^{K} This concert was a part of the "Bay City River Roar"
^{L} This concert was a part of "Zootunes"
^{M} This concert was a part of the "Red Butte Garden Outdoor Concert Series"
^{N} This concert was a part of the "Sturgis Motorcycle Rally"
^{O} This concert was a part of the "Lowell Summer Music Series"

Cancellations and rescheduled shows

September 11, 2015	Enoch Cree Nation 135, Canada	The Venue at River Cree	Moved to the Northern Alberta Jubilee Auditorium in Edmonton, Canada
December 29, 2015	Marion Bay, Australia	Falls Farm Festival Site	Cancelled. This concert was a part of the "Falls Music & Arts Festival"
January 5, 2016	Auckland, New Zealand	Powerstation	Cancelled
January 10, 2016	Busselton, Australia	Sir Stewart Bovell Park	Cancelled. This concert was a part of "Southbound"

=== Box office score data ===
Venue	City	Tickets sold / available	Gross revenue
Ryman Auditorium	Nashville	2,251 / 2,251 (100%)	$100,104
Carpenter Theater	Richmond	1,650 / 1,778 (93%)	$84,910
Pier Six Pavilion	Baltimore	3,804 / 4,140 (92%)	$157,480
The Colosseum at Caesars Windsor	Windsor	3,714 / 4,934 (75%)	$140,625
Chicago Theatre	Chicago	3,444 / 3,444 (100%)	$146,700
Hamilton Place Theatre	Hamilton	2,193 / 2,193 (100%)	$96,439
Mann Center for the Performing Arts	Philadelphia	3,618 / 4,426 (82%)	$150,076
Paramount Theatre	Huntington	1,013 / 1,013 (100%)	$74,238
Ruth Eckerd Hall	Clearwater	2,080 / 2,080 (100%)	$81,623
Au-Rene Theater	Fort Lauderdale	2,362 / 2,528 (93%)	$107,870
Rio Vista Outdoor Amphitheater	Laughlin	1,577 / 3,170 (50%)	$77,273
Greek Theatre	Los Angeles	5,280 / 5,836 (90%)	$285,805
Eventim Apollo	London	3,234 / 3,400 (95%)	$136,683
Palais Theatre	Melbourne	2,190 / 2,786 (79%)	$164,671
Mann Performing Arts Center	Fort Myers	1,102 / 1,781 (62%)	$54,990
Ziff Ballet Opera House	Miami	1,176 / 2,187 (54%)	$51,103
St. Augustine Amphitheatre	St. Augustine	2,259 / 2,800 (81%)	$90,235
BJCC Concert Hall	Birmingham	1,826 / 2,835 (64%)	$75,968
Smith Concert Hall	Huntsville	1,903 / 1,903 (100%)	$87,311
Fox Theatre	Atlanta	1,900 / 4,543 (42%)	$108,780
McGrath Amphitheatre	Cedar Rapids	2,090 / 3,472 (60%)	$104,450
State Theatre	Minneapolis	2,117 / 2,118 (100%)	$111,827
Thrivent Financial Hall	Appleton	1,970 / 2,004 (98%)	$105,433
Overture Hall	Madison	2,143 / 2,184 (98%)	$112,200
Coronado Theatre	Rockford	1,497 / 2,180 (69%)	$75,193
Benedum Center	Pittsburgh	2,741 / 2,823 (97%)	$118,153
Radio City Music Hall	New York City	5,740 / 5,740 (100%)	$338,675
TOTAL		66,874 / 80,549 (83%)	$3,238,815
