= List of events at Vicar Street =

Vicar Street has hosted some of the world's best known performers and comedy acts from around the world. Here are some of the acts that have performed at the venue.

== Comedy Performances ==
Date(s)	Artist(s)	Notes/Show
Dara Ó Briain	January 23–24, 28–31, February 4–7, 18–19 & 21, 2010; June 24–25 & 27, July 3, 8–10 & 16 & 27, 2010, September 2–5, 9–12, 2010; January 4–7, 11–14, 25–28, 2012, February 1–3, July 4–7, 11–14, September 6–8, 13–15, 20, 2012; November 22–24, 28–30, December 1, 2012	30 Shows in 2010 - SOLD OUT "Craic Dealer"( 37 shows in 2012)
Tommy Tiernan	November 27–21 & December 1–5, 2010; January 6–8, 13–15, 20–23, 27–29, June 16–17 & 24–25, 2011; April 5,7 & 12–14 & 19–21 & 28, 2012; January 3–6, 10–11, 17–20, 24–27, 2013	"Crooked Man" (2011) "Poot" (2012) "Stray Sod" (2013)
Neil Delamere	December 17, 2010; February 11–12 & May 6, 2011; November 26 & December 17, 2011, February 10–11, March 9, 2012; February 8–9, 2013; February 7–8, 2014	"Implement of Divilment" (2011) "Restructuring" (2012) "DelaMere Mortal" (2013) "Smart Bomb" (2014)
Jason Byrne	December 18, 2010; May 21, 2011; February 1, 2013; January 11 & 18, 2014	"Cirque du Byrne" (2011) "The People's Puppeteer" (2013)
Katherine Lynch	December 9–12, 2010; February 3–5, 2011; May 13–14, 2011; December 2, 2011	"The Hack of Ya Tour"
Stephen K Amos	February 17, 2011	
Andrew Maxwell	February 19 & September 23, 2011; February 4, 2012; March 8, 2013	
D'Unbelievables	February 21–26, 2010; March 7–12, 2010; April 18–21 & 23, 2010	"One Hell of a Do Tour"
David McSavage	March 5, 2011; February 18, 2012	"He's Alive Inside"
The Nualas	March 25, 2011 & June 8, 2012	"One Night of Dignity" (2012)
Sarah Millican	April 2 & October 16, 2011	"Chatterbox"
Des Bishop	April 28,30 & June 11, 2011; 25–26 May & 22–23 June 2012	"My Dad was Nearly James Bond" "Offbeat" (May) "Likes To Bang" (June)
Jason Manford	September 16–17, 2011; November 27–28, 2013	First World Problems (2013)
Dylan Moran	October 5–9 & 27–29, 2011	"Yeah Yeah"
Tim Minchin	October 13–15 & 30, 2011	
Demetri Martin	October 18, 2011	
Micky Flanagan	October 22, 2011	"Out Out"
Dave Gorman	November 5, 2011; October 10, 2014	"Dave Gorman's Powerpoint Presentation" "Gets Straight to the Point* (*The Power Point)
Reginald D. Hunter	November 18, 2011; May 24, 2013	"Sometimes Even The Devil Tells The Truth" (2011) "In The Midst Of Crackers" (2013)
Stephen Merchant	November 23–24, 2011	"Hello Ladies...Tour"
Omid Djalili	December 3, 2011	"Tour of Duty"
Dead Cat Bounce	December 23, 2011	"Howl of the She-leopard"
Jay and Silent Bob	February 21–22, 2012	"Get Old Tour"
PJ Gallagher	March 23 & May 4, 2012	
Simon Amstell	May 21–22, 2010; May 5, 2012	"Do Nothing" (Recorded for DVD) "Numb"
Stewart Lee	May 17–18, 2012	"Carpet Remnant World"
Stewart Francis	June 9, 2012	"Outstanding In His Field"
John Bishop	September 9–11, 2012	"Rollercoaster Tour Preview"
Joan Rivers	October 9–10, 2012	"The Now or Never Tour"
Rhod Gilbert	October 11–12, 2012	"The Man with the Flaming Battenberg Tattoo"
Patrick Kielty	October 13, 2012	
Mario Rosenstock	October 18–20 & 25–27, 2012	"Gift Grub 2 Live"
Jimeoin	November 3, 2012	"Lovely"
Greg Davies	December 8, 2012	"The Back of my Mum's Head"
Al Murray	March 9 & November 15, 2013	"The Only Way Is Epic Tour" (2013)

== Music Performances ==
Date(s)	Artist(s)	Notes
February 17, 2001	Gary Numan	Pure Album Tour. First Irish concert
April 18–19, 25, 28 & August 4–5, 2010	Jedward	Planet Jedward Tour
December 19–20, 2010; September 26, 2011; December 13,14,18,20,21, 2011; December 11,12,19 & 20, 2012, January 8, 2013	Christy Moore	with Declan Sinnott; Songs for Somalia w/ Declan Sinnott. with Declan Sinnott
December 21–22, 2010	Villagers	First show SOLD OUT
December 23, 2010	Springbreak	
December 27, 2010; July 2, 2011; December 27, 2012	Aslan	
December 28–30, 2010; December 29–30, 2011; December 28–30, 2012	The Dubliners	
December 31, 2010; December 31, 2012	Mixed Tape New Year's Eve Party	with Cathy Davey, Lisa Hannigan and many more with Paddy Casey, Cathy Davey and more
January 4, 2010	Vibe for Philo - 25th Anniversary	Brian "Robbo" Robertson
January 31 & February 1, 2011	Imelda May	
February 18, 2011; November 26, 2012	Ben Folds; Ben Folds Five	European Tour
March 4, 2011	The Decemberists	
March 26, 2011; March 31, 2012	The Fureys & Davey Arthur	
March 30 & June 9, 2011; November 29, 2011	The Frames; The Frames with The Mary Janes & Friends	Performing New Album; In aid of The Fragile X Society
April 1, 2011; November 11–12, 2011; September 28, 2012	Paul Brady	with Andy Irvine
April 5, 2011	Children of Bodom	
April 6 & 7, 2011; November 17, 2012	Bell X1	
April 8, 2011	Cry Before Dawn	
April 9, 2011	The Unthanks	
April 10, 2011	The Low Anthem	
April 15–16, 2011	Josh Ritter	And The Royal City Band
May 1, 2011	The Human League	
May 5, 2011	Jamie Lawson	
May 7, 2011	The High Kings	Irish Tour
May 16, 2011	Explosions in the Sky	
May 17, 2011	Grant Lee Buffalo	
May 18, 2011	Mercury Rev	Performing Deserters Songs Live
May 27 & July 1, 2011	Jack L	Piano and Strings Evening
June 1, 2011; October 24, 2012	The Tallest Man on Earth	
June 3, 2011	Olly Murs	First headlining Tour
June 5, 2011	Andrea Corr	
June 18–19, 2011	Grinderman	Second show added due to demand.
June 20, 2011	Paul Simon	SOLD OUT
June 27, 2011	Ziggy Marley	
July 4, 2011	Gregg Allman	Moved from The Grand Canal Theatre
July 16, 2011	Richard Thompson	
July 21, 2011	Black Country Communion	
July 22, 2011	Tom Tom Club	
July 27, 2011	Brian Setzer	Rockabilly Riot
July 29–30, 2011	Morrissey	SOLD OUT
September 9, 2011; December 22–23, 2012	Damien Dempsey	
September 18, 2011	Squeeze	
September 27, 2011	Crosby & Nash	
November 4, 2011	Ed Sheeran	First Irish Headline show
November 19, 2011	Anna Calvi	
November 25, 2011	Adam Ant	
December 5–6, 2011	Bombay Bicycle Club	Extra date added due to demand.
December 8, 2011	Pajama Men	
December 9, 2011	David Kitt	Performing The Big Romance
December 10, 2011	Agnes Obel	Irish Tour
December 22, 2011; March 16, 2012	Lisa Hannigan	Irish Tour
January 20, 2012; 16–17 June 2012	Andy Irvine, Dónal Lunny, Liam O'Flynn & Paddy Glackin	Celebrating his 70th Birthday
January 21, 2012	Henry Rollins	The Long March (Spoken Word)
January 31, 2012	Bonnie Prince Billy	
February 9, 2012; January 12–13, 2013	Dropkick Murphy's	European Tour; Album launch shows
February 15, 2012	Nick Lowe	
March 1–2, 2012	Randy Newman	European Tour
March 7, 2012	Jeff Magnum	
March 10, 2012	Therapy?	
March 17, 2012	The Presidents of the United States of America	
March 24, 2012	Spiritualized	Moved from October 7, 2010
May 17, 2012	Hue and Cry	"Hot Wire Stripped"
May 19, 2012	Bob Geldof	First Irish show since 2005.
May 24, 2012	Dionne Warwick	
July 15, 2012	Tune-Yards	
July 18, 2012	Ministry	"Defibrillatour"
July 19, 2012	John Hiatt	
July 24, 2012	Dr. John and The Lower 911	
September 21, 2012	The Stunning	
September 22, 2012	Joan Armatrading	
September 27, 2012	Darren Hayes	"The Secret's Out Tour"
October 28, 2012	Beach House	
October 29, 2012	The Walkmen	
November 4, 2012	The Stylistics	
November 6, 2012	Animal Collective	
November 25, 2012	First Aid Kit	
December 4, 2012	Steve Vai	
December 18, 2012	Glen Hansard	
December 21, 2012	Delorentos	
January 21, 2013	Paloma Faith	
February 26, 2013	Cody Simpson	Welcome to Paradise Tour
April 13, 2013	Matchbox Twenty	North Tour
October 28, 2013 & March 29, 2014	Keywest	sold out
October 26, 2015	"Weird Al" Yankovic	The Mandatory World Tour
