= Mandatory Fun =

Studio album by "Weird Al" Yankovic
- Released: July 15, 2014
- Recorded: September 4, 2012 – June 12, 2014
- Studios: Way Station (Los Angeles, California); GoDaveyGo (Los Angeles); Bedrock L.A. (Los Angeles); Mad Oak (Allston, Massachusetts)
- Genres: Comedy; parody
- Length: 45:20
- Labels: RCA; Way Moby
- Producer: "Weird Al" Yankovic

"Weird Al" Yankovic chronology
Alpocalypse (2011)	Mandatory Fun (2014)	Squeeze Box (2017)

Mandatory Fun is the fourteenth and final studio album by the American parody musician "Weird Al" Yankovic. The self-produced album was released by RCA Records in the United States on July 15, 2014. Yankovic had previously released Alpocalypse in 2011 and was touring in support of it when he first spoke of his next record. When he began to work on Mandatory Fun, Yankovic found himself listening to older acts, many of which he stylistically spoofed on the album.

Recorded at studios in Los Angeles and Massachusetts from 2012 to 2014, Mandatory Fun contains twelve songs, which include parodies of songs by Pharrell Williams, Robin Thicke, Iggy Azalea, Lorde and Imagine Dragons. It also features original songs in the form of pastiche, imitating the styles of the Pixies, Cat Stevens, Foo Fighters, Crosby, Stills & Nash and Southern Culture on the Skids. Yankovic composed the originals first and wrote the parodies last to allow them to be as timely as possible upon the album's release. Many artists reacted positively to being parodied; Williams remarked that he was "honored" to be spoofed by Yankovic, while Imagine Dragons advised Yankovic on how to replicate sounds in their original song.

After Yankovic's 32 years under contract, Mandatory Fun became his first and remains his only number-one album in the United States. It received positive reviews from contemporary music critics. Yankovic chose not to release a lead single and instead publicized the album by launching eight music videos online during the first week of the album release through different video content portals. Among these, "Word Crimes" became Yankovic's fourth top 40 song, making him one of few artists to achieve such a feat in four separate decades.

The album won the award for Best Comedy Album at the 57th Annual Grammy Awards, Yankovic's fourth career Grammy, and he embarked on the Mandatory World Tour during 2015 and 2016. Following the completion of his record contract obligations and the success of the video strategy, Yankovic has avoided releasing any further studio albums, preferring the more timely releases of singles and EPs of his songs.

== Background ==
During the closing stages of the Alpocalypse tour, Yankovic stated in an interview with The Morning Call that he had one more album on his contract; the paper and other sources took to mean that this album would be his last. Yankovic later clarified that this was the last album on the current recording contract with his label, that he is currently "weighing his options" for renewing the contract or looking to another publisher, and made it clear that he was not retiring from music in the foreseeable future. In a later interview with NPR's Weekend Edition, he stated that this might be his last conventional album, turning instead to more frequent releases of singles and EPs. For an LP, Yankovic stated that given the time lapse between the beginning of the process and the release of the finished product, "chances are a lot of the material is going to be somewhat dated by the time it comes out".

The first tracks conceived for the album were original songs in the style of various bands as, compared to direct parodies, the pastiches "age better". Prior to composing these songs, Yankovic had been listening to older acts such as Cat Stevens, Foo Fighters, and Southern Culture on the Skids for his own amusement. His Crosby, Stills & Nash style parody "Mission Statement" draws from his experiences attending executive meetings in his music career. Shortly after completing the song, Yankovic encountered Graham Nash, who coincidentally asked Yankovic to parody "Suite: Judy Blue Eyes". Yankovic played a recording of his pastiche on his phone to Nash on the spot, and Nash loved the track. "First World Problems" is an original composition emulating the style of the Pixies, whom Yankovic had performed alongside for a charity concert two years earlier. The song features background vocals by Amanda Palmer, emulating the vocal style of Kim Deal (particularly from the song "Debaser"). Palmer, who cites Yankovic and the Pixies as being among her childhood heroes, explained on her personal website that she and Yankovic had met at one of her concerts in Los Angeles a few years previously. After Yankovic learned that his fans had petitioned for him to headline a Super Bowl halftime show, he realized that he lacked a sports-themed composition in his repertoire, and decided to write "Sports Song".

Yankovic described that his usual method of generating parody ideas is to scan Billboard charts, radio play and online buzz to create a master list of candidates. From that point, he works out possible puns on the song titles, the potential for humor, and general direction for his versions. Fans speculated ahead of the album's release that Yankovic would parody "Let It Go", from the Disney film Frozen, due to the song's popularity. He considered making a Frozen parody titled "Make It So" about Star Trek: The Next Generation, but decided not to after discovering such a parody already existed. Yankovic observed that the existing spoof "had gotten enough attention online to make the Disney legal department ask them to take it down! I couldn't think of an idea that I liked as much as 'Make It So', so... I gave up!". There were several other songs he intended to parody, but felt he was unable to develop a clever enough idea for, and instead used them in the medley "NOW That's What I Call Polka!". More specifically, Yankovic expressed that while Daft Punk's "Get Lucky" is an "iconic song", it was too repetitive for him to incorporate new lyrics into effectively.

== Recording ==
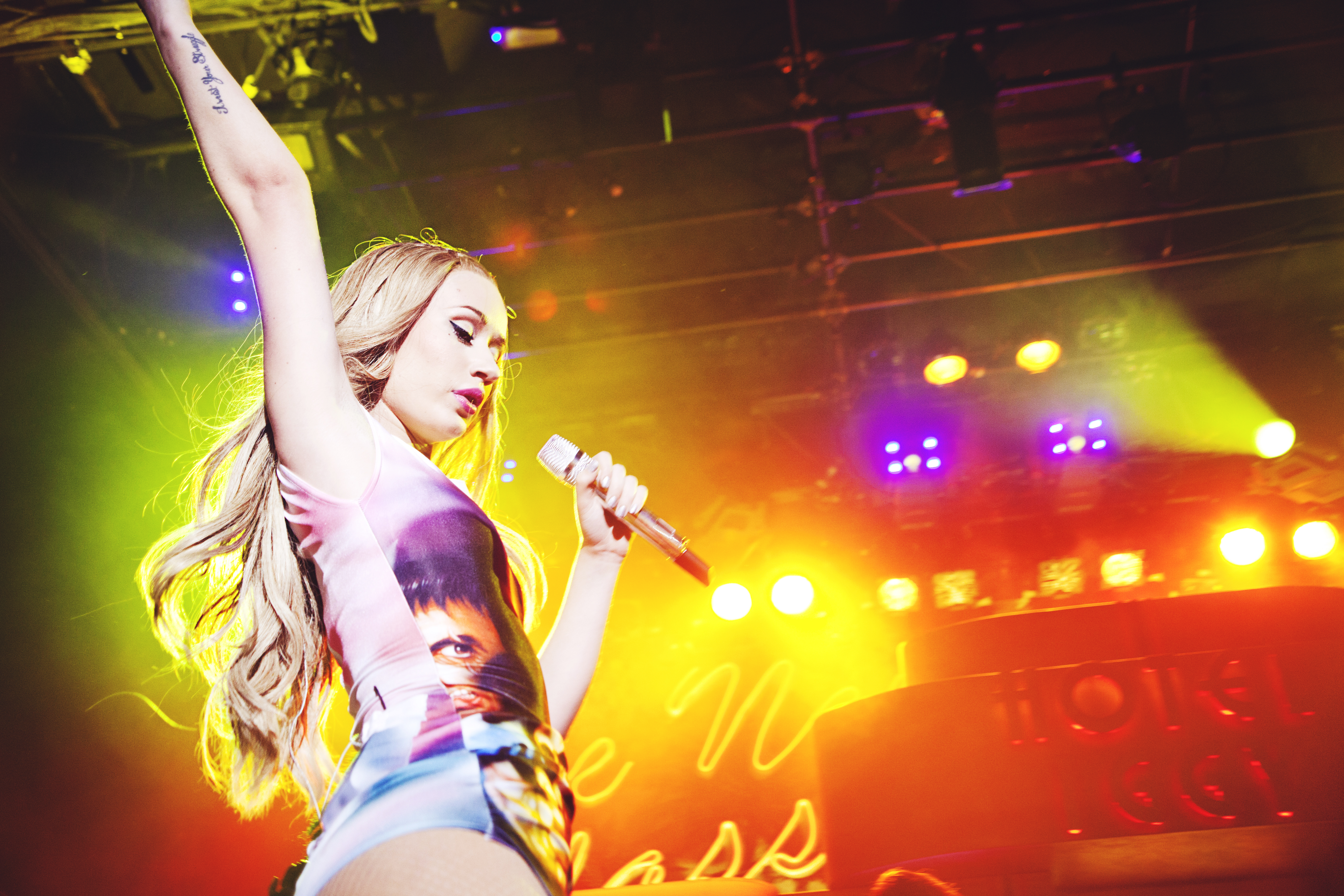
Yankovic approached Iggy Azalea in person for permission to parody her song "Fancy".

Twelve songs were recorded for Mandatory Fun. Most of the sessions took place at Way Station, GoDaveyGo Studio and Bedrock L.A. in Los Angeles. Yankovic pre-recorded demos of each song on his personal laptop prior to recording, to show his bandmates the direction to go in. The earliest songs produced were "Mission Statement", "Lame Claim to Fame" and "My Own Eyes", which were recorded on September 4, 2012. Three more songs were recorded later: "Sports Song" on May 3, followed by "First World Problems" and "Jackson Park Express" on May 8, 2013. Yankovic announced Amanda Palmer's involvement on the album later that month. Her background vocal sessions for "First World Problems" took place at Mad Oak Studios in Allston, Massachusetts, as she was unable to travel to L.A. at the time. Yankovic coached Palmer remotely via Skype as she attempted to emulate the vocal style of Kim Deal.

Yankovic sought permission from the original artists for his parodies, as he had typically done in the past; in contrast to previous albums, he had few difficulties. Yankovic stated "This is the first time where I've gotten everybody that I wanted, and I couldn't be happier about it." He was able to get Pharrell Williams' permission for three of the songs he represented on the album, Williams' "Happy", Robin Thicke's "Blurred Lines", and "Get Lucky", through a personal email to the artist after Yankovic's manager had difficulty working with Williams' manager; according to Yankovic, Williams was "honored" to have his work used by Yankovic. Yankovic and his band got full cooperation from Imagine Dragons, who gave permission and advised on how to recreate some of the sounds used in "Radioactive" for Yankovic's sendup "Inactive".

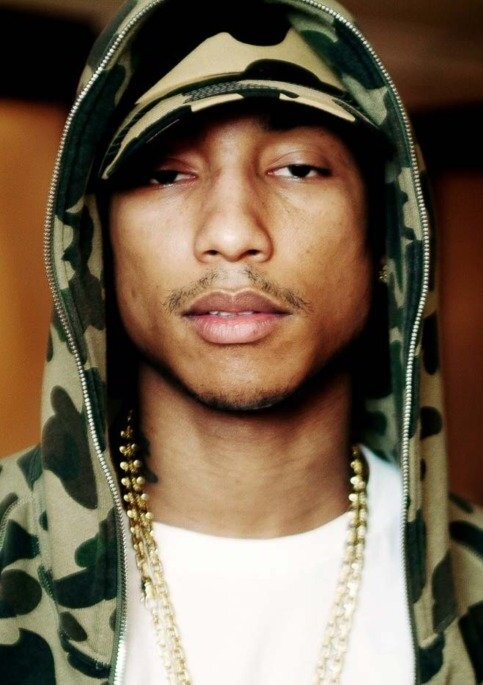
Pharrell Williams was "honored" to give Yankovic permission to use his song "Happy".

When Yankovic decided to parody "Blurred Lines", he was initially concerned that by the time his version was released, a year later, many parodies would already exist. He therefore opted to go in a more distinct direction by making "Word Crimes", which continues his fascination with grammar previously expressed in video set pieces where he corrected malformed public signage and text. Yankovic said that his version avoids the perceived misogyny of the original song and its various existing parodies. He also considered this "the only chance that 'Blurred Lines' will be used in the curriculum of somebody's school". "Word Crimes", "Inactive" and "Foil" were all recorded in December 2013 while "Tacky" and "NOW That's What I Call Polka!" were produced the following April. Lisa Popeil also revealed in April that she would be recording with Yankovic for the album. Comedian Patton Oswalt, who appears in the video for "Foil", listened to Yankovic's album in May 2014 and revealed that "He satirizes a band I've worshiped since the 90s". Yankovic later affirmed that Oswalt was referring to his Pixies pastiche.

Eleven tracks had been completed by early 2014, and Yankovic set the release date in the middle of the year as to keep the material "as timely as possible". However, he wished to find "the big hit of the summer" to add to the set. Yankovic recalled that he determined the saturation point of Iggy Azalea's "Fancy" by asking his daughter: "I said, 'Are they talking about Iggy Azalea at school?' And she says, 'Well, not so much.' I asked the same thing two weeks later and she said, 'Oh yeah, that's all they're talking about now!'" Yankovic then traveled from Los Angeles to Denver, Colorado in early June 2014 to ask Azalea permission to parody her song. He noted that meeting a spoof target in person is not his usual method for obtaining permission, but was necessary in this instance to meet the album deadline. The encounter was described by TMZ as an "ambush" as Yankovic presented the potential parody lyrics to Azalea backstage at one of her concerts. He later clarified that the meeting was much more polite and blown out of proportion by TMZ. Yankovic recorded the Azalea parody "Handy" that same month, and announced that the album mastering process was complete on June 12.

== Composition ==
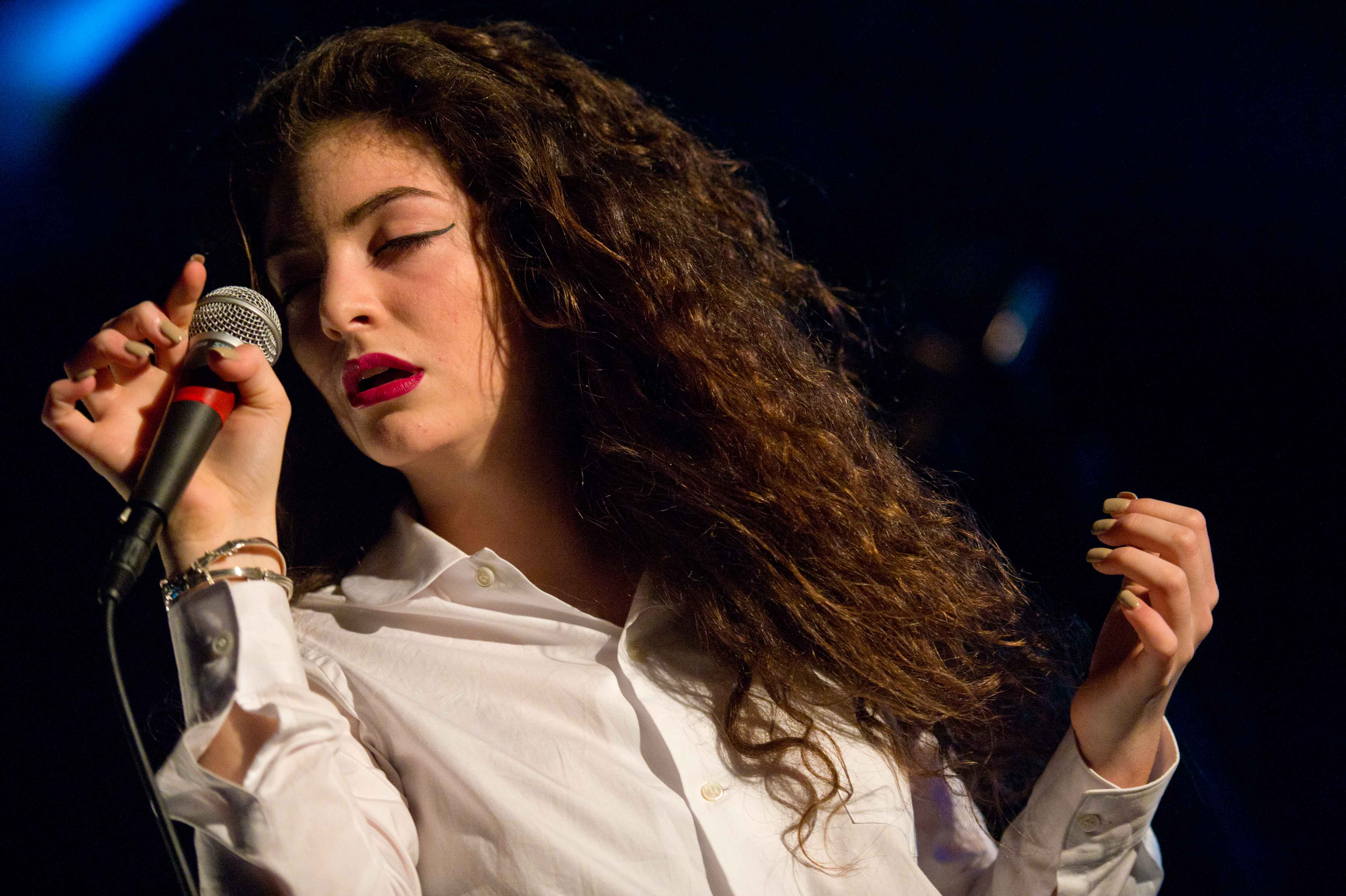
Lorde's song "Royals" is parodied on the album (pictured above in 2013).

Mandatory Fun consists of twelve tracks, five of which are parodies of songs popular at the time of the album's production. The opening Iggy Azalea parody of "Fancy" is "Handy", performed from the point of view of a person described by Kenneth Partridge of Billboard as "the world's most braggadocious contractor". The character portrayed in the song rhymes about various handyman tasks including installing countertops, tile floors, and repairing leaf blowers. Kevin O'Keeffe of The Wire noted that the only direct connection between the character and Azalea is the line "I got 99 problems but a switch ain't one", which refers to Azalea's appearance in the song "Problem".

The Southern Culture on the Skids pastiche "Lame Claim to Fame" examines celebrity-obsessed culture. It features frequent name-drops as the singer brags about having tangential associations with popular people. "Foil" is a parody of the Lorde song "Royals" and focuses on two cases of aluminum foil use: the first verse deals with food being preserved with the material, while the second verse describes the foil being used by conspiracy theorists as a protective hat. O'Keeffe observed that it is the shortest parody on Mandatory Fun as it omits the bridge and final chorus of the original song. The original composition "Sports Song" imagines a college marching band directly insulting the opposing team with their fight song. Annie Zaleski of The A.V. Club summarized the track as a "passable but not particularly inspired take on rabid fandom".

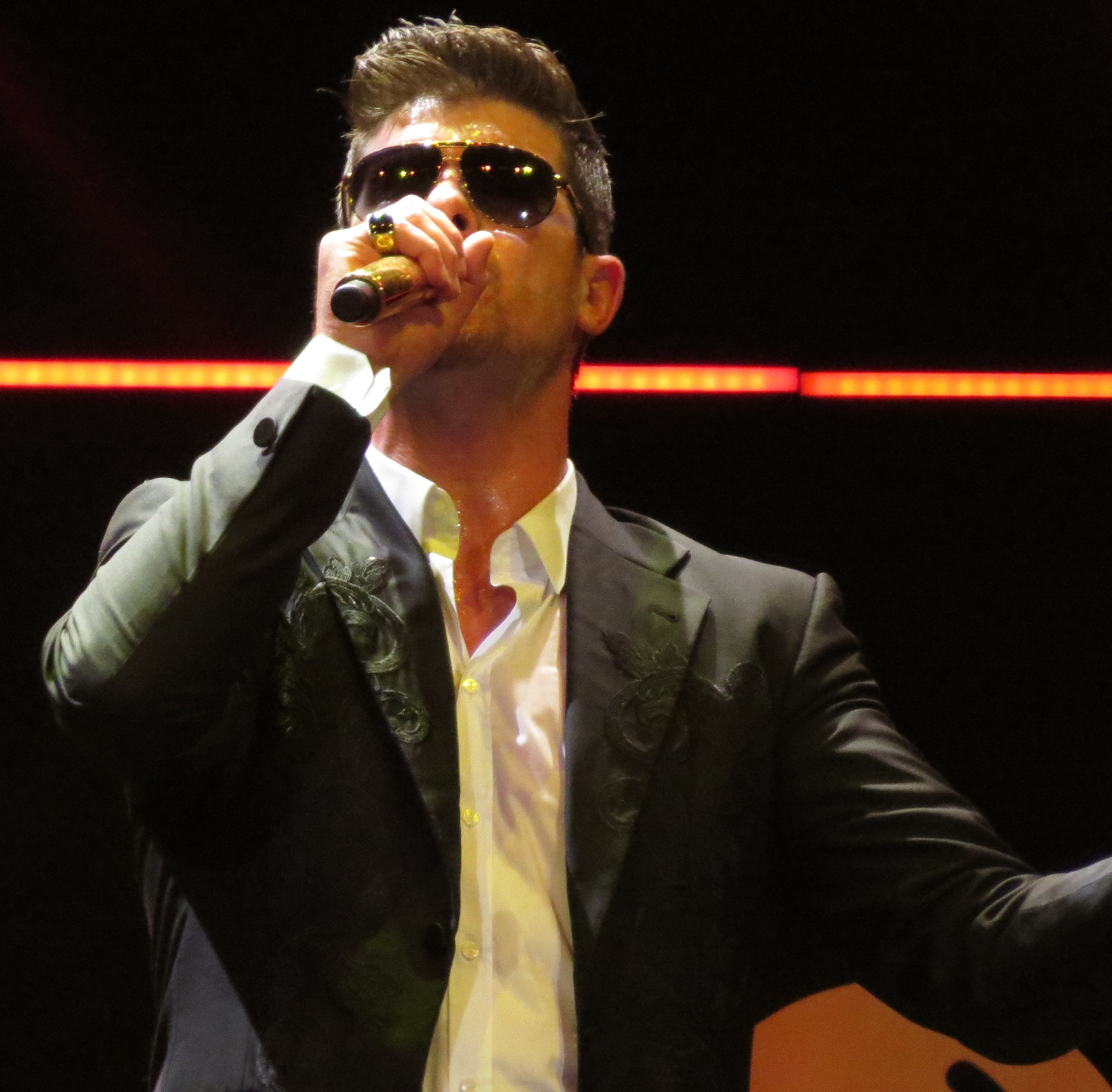
"Word Crimes" parodies "Blurred Lines" by Robin Thicke (pictured above in 2013).

The following Robin Thicke parody, "Word Crimes", involves the singer pointing out common grammatical errors and shaming people who engage in various other common textual misconceptions. "My Own Eyes" is a style parody of the Foo Fighters in which the protagonist recalls witnessing unusual events throughout his life, such as elderly men dying of "Bieber fever" and a mime "hacked to death with an imaginary cleaver". Partridge felt that the pastiche "falls flat" without Dave Grohl's songwriting and personality. "NOW That's What I Call Polka!" is Yankovic's twelfth polka medley, in which Yankovic sings selections of various popular songs at the time of recording, set to a polka music. The title is a parody of the long-running series of compilation albums released by EMI, Now That's What I Call Music!.

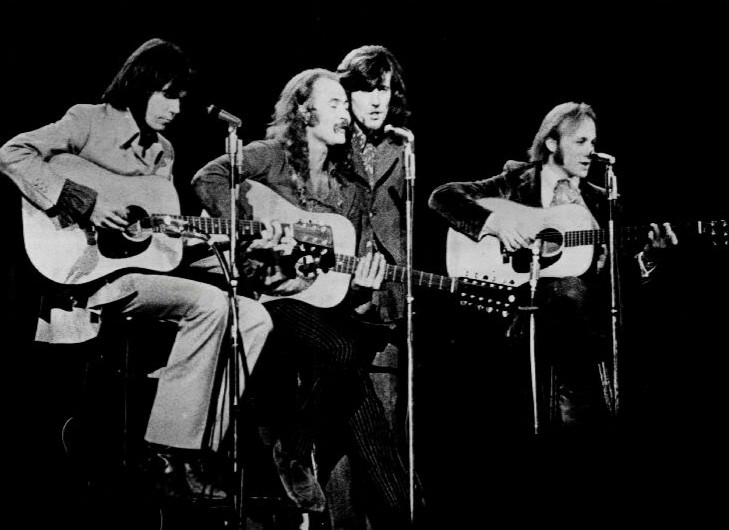
"Mission Statement" emulates the style of Crosby, Stills & Nash (pictured above, along with Neil Young in 1970).

The song "Mission Statement" emulates the style of Crosby, Stills & Nash, with the lyrics citing a series of corporate buzzwords and executive jargon. Yankovic considered it "ironic to juxtapose that with the song stylings of CSN, whose music pretty much symbolizes the antithesis of corporate America". Rolling Stone noted that the song imitates the band's layered harmonies used in "Carry On" and "Suite: Judy Blue Eyes".

"Inactive" is a spoof of the Imagine Dragons song "Radioactive" that centers on an extremely lethargic character covered in food residue. O'Keeffe remarked upon the breathing sounds of the original song being recontextualized in the parody, as the character mentions that he requires an inhaler. The Pixies pastiche "First World Problems" lampoons people who complain of various First World problems such as the lack of gluten-free cookies in an airport lounge. The song features "off-kilter guitars and a Black Francis-esque raucous vocal delivery" with stylistic references to the Pixies songs "Debaser" and "Hang Wire". The sendup of Pharrell Williams' "Happy" is the song "Tacky", in which the singer boasts of having no shame and making unfashionable or tactless choices. Reviews noted that the song lists various disruptive acts associated with social media, referencing Instagram, Twitter, and Yelp.

Following Yankovic's tradition of recording long-form songs such as "Albuquerque", "Genius in France", and "Trapped in the Drive-Thru", he concludes the album with a 9-minute plus track called "Jackson Park Express". The song is in the style of Cat Stevens and can be described as "an in-depth vignette about a bus-ride-length romance that's really a figment of the protagonist's imagination." Another review detailed that the piece is a conversation between two bus passengers involving topics such as relationships, deodorant, and wearing the skin of another person; the protagonist insists that the latter is "not in a creepy way." Comedy website Chortle opined that "Jackson Park Express" is the best song on the album and "arguably the funniest one he's ever written."

== Packaging ==
The cover art and title of the album was first affirmed via the RCA Records website. Regarding the title of the album, Yankovic commented that "That was just an oxymoron that I've always been amused by. It's used a lot in corporate retreats and, I'm told, in the military." Yankovic also acknowledged that the name is speculated to be a reference to the album marking the end of his 32-year-long label contract.

The artwork is designed to resemble an agglomeration of Soviet and Chinese propaganda, and Yankovic is described by Rolling Stone as wearing a Russian military costume over a font resembling Soviet text. Communist propaganda is often drawn in shades of red, features people marching, and is supported in the background by an image of a leader. Yankovic stated that the cover image was photographed as early as August 2013. Yankovic said the cover art was a play on the name Mandatory Fun.

== Promotion ==
Before the album was complete and a release date was set, Yankovic had already booked promotional appearances that coincidentally fell around the album's time of release: this included an appearance on the YouTube series Epic Rap Battles of History where he dressed as Isaac Newton and the Comedy Central series Drunk History where he played Adolf Hitler. Yankovic started hinting at the release of Mandatory Fun using social media in mid-June 2014. On June 14, he posted a self-described "cryptic" image of himself with the message "July 15", which Rolling Stone specified as being the album release date. Yankovic used a series of short trailers to tease the album, using stock footage of historical communism and military propaganda films interspersed with imagery from the album cover art. He later observed that his portrayal of Hitler on Drunk History fit the "totalitarian theme" of the Mandatory Fun artwork.

Yankovic announced that there would be no pre-album single for Mandatory Fun and instead he would let the listeners decide which songs are the hits. He also revealed that he would participate in a Reddit "Ask Me Anything" session on the day of the album release. Yankovic explained that the pre-release campaign deliberately withheld song information, since he felt it has become more difficult to establish a unique take on a parody in the age of YouTube content creation. He later made an appearance on the Hulu sitcom The Hotwives of Orlando that coincided with the Mandatory Fun launch. After the album was released, he elaborated that putting out singles was technically unnecessary, since customers can buy the songs individually from digital vendors.

Yankovic made a commitment not to tour for an entire year during 2014, instead using Mandatory Fun to tour "with a vengeance" in 2015. The Mandatory World Tour was announced in January 2015, and covered venues in the United States, Canada, Europe, Australia, and New Zealand throughout 2015 starting that May. Yankovic continued this tour in 2016 primarily across North America.

=== Music videos ===
"I wanted to really do what is ostensibly my last album with a big splash. I wanted the first week to be big; I wanted every single day of release week to be an event. I wanted a video to go viral for an entire day and have people talking about that video, and then the next day they're talking about a new video. I just thought that would be a really fun way to do it."

— "Weird Al" Yankovic, on the marketing campaign

To help promote Mandatory Fun in social media circles, Yankovic produced eight music videos for the album; one was revealed each day starting on July 14, 2014, a day prior to the album's release. Yankovic commented that "there is no more music television" as there was in the past, and that "the Internet [...] is the new MTV" that operates continuously. Yankovic came up with the idea for the video promotion of the new album about two years before its release. He felt that releasing a new video for eight continuous days "would make an impact because people would be talking about the album all week long". The approach has been compared to Beyoncé Knowles' marketing for her album Beyoncé which took advantage of social media; when asked if this video strategy was influenced by Knowles, Yankovic pointed out that his previous record Alpocalypse featured videos for every song at the time of release: "Nobody said to Beyoncé, 'Hey, you're doing a Weird Al, aren't ya?' So for the record, I was first."

Although the music video aspect of Yankovic's songs had long been a part of his success, RCA Records opted not to fund any video production for Mandatory Fun. Yankovic instead turned to various social media portals including Funny or Die and CollegeHumor which he had worked with in the past; these sites helped to cover the production cost of the videos with Yankovic forgoing any video ad revenue. He chose to distribute the videos to different portals to avoid burdening any single one with all of the costs and work needed to produce them. This release strategy was considered by The Atlantic as a "web-enabled precision video delivery operation, and evidence of some serious digital distributional forethought" as it allows the videos to be seen by different sets of audiences for each site. During an interview on Fox Business, Yankovic explained his method of funding to Stuart Varney, who seemed to misunderstand the possible monetization of Yankovic's videos.

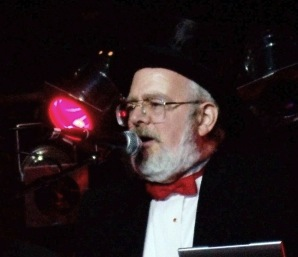
Dr. Demento, the radio host who helped to launch Yankovic's career, is featured throughout the video "Lame Claim to Fame".

The first music video debuted on July 14, featuring the song "Tacky". Produced by Nerdist Industries, the one-shot video mimics Williams' own style used in his video for "Happy": It features Aisha Tyler, Margaret Cho, Eric Stonestreet, Kristen Schaal, Jack Black and Yankovic dressed in tacky clothes and dancing poorly on purpose while lip-synching to the song's lyrics about a person who brags on about his questionable style choices. The video was filmed at Palace Theatre in downtown Los Angeles, previously featured as Julianne Moore's apartment in 1998 film The Big Lebowski. Yankovic specified that during each of the six continuous takes, he had to rush down five flights of stairs while changing his outfit in order to appear in the beginning and end of the video. The video for "Word Crimes" features kinetic typography created by Jarrett Heather, reflecting the song's theme of proper grammar, spelling, and punctuation. The "Foil" video, produced in conjunction with CollegeHumor, shows Yankovic as the host of a cooking show obsessing on the use of aluminium foil, suddenly descending into conspiracy theories; it also includes guest appearances by Patton Oswalt, Tom Lennon, and Robert Ben Garant.

"Handy" was released through Yahoo! Screen's "Sketchy" channel, and it is presented in the style of a late-night infomercial with Yankovic performing as a residential general contractor; the video also includes Eddie Pepitone, Justin Giddings, and Ted Hollis. The video for "Sports Song" plays to the song's theme, featuring Yankovic along with the Riverside City College Marching Tigers band performing a routine on a football field during the song; the video was directed by Yankovic with Andrew Bush and Brad Schulz and produced in conjunction with Funny or Die. The video for "First World Problems" was directed by Liam Lynch and shows Yankovic, posing as a "pretentious jerk" wearing a "douchey blonde wig", over-reacting to minor annoyances of a well-off lifestyle.

"Lame Claim to Fame" is a stop-motion video directed by animator Tim Thompson, using a scrapbooking approach to show the protagonist's passing ties with various celebrities. This video took over a year and a half to complete. Among the cut-outs of celebrities named in the song, the video includes pictures of Dr. Demento, the radio host that helped Yankovic's rise to popularity, his band members, and numerous references to past songs he wrote. The final video was for "Mission Statement", which was released via the Wall Street Journal. The video was produced by the business marketing company TruScribe, featuring their time-lapse whiteboard drawings which they have done for advertisements for companies like Microsoft and PayPal. It took about 10 months to create, going back and forth with Yankovic to match their drawings to the concept and musical themes of the song.

== Reception ==
Professional ratings
Aggregate scores
Source	Rating
Metacritic	77/100
Review scores
Source	Rating
AllMusic	4/5 stars
The A.V. Club	B+
Billboard	76/100
Consequence of Sound	B−
Exclaim!	8/10
Los Angeles Times	4/4 stars
Paste	7.7/10
Pitchfork	7.8/10
PopMatters	6/10
Rolling Stone	3/5 stars

=== Critical response ===
The review aggregator website Metacritic gave the album an average score of 77, based on 11 reviews, which indicates "generally favorable reviews". The Los Angeles Times gave the album a perfect four star rating and called it a "stone cold masterpiece", praising how the album's parody tracks work well from their original material with Yankovic's take on the lyrics. The A.V. Club considered the album successful with only a few missteps, with "smart meta-commentary on pop music and a collection that never takes itself too seriously". Rolling Stone reviewed the song "Tacky" stating that "Weird Al is in fine form throughout the track".

ABC News's Allan Raible described the album as among his best work, writing, "What makes this one sharp is that it really captures the current culture in a bubble in a way that is more pinpointed than on previous records." Billboard considered the record's original songs its best material and "Word Crimes" the best parody. Paste similarly agreed that Yankovic's original materials were the highlight of the album and that, as a whole, Mandatory Fun is "a good, humorous album that shows that Yankovic is not slowing down in the slightest".

Mandatory Fun won the Grammy Award for Best Comedy Album at the 57th edition.

=== Commercial performance ===
Mandatory Fun debuted atop the United States Billboard 200 on the week of August 2, 2014. This makes it Yankovic's first number one album on the chart in his more than 30-year career. Mandatory Fun was the first comedy album to debut at the number one slot. Mandatory Fun is also the first comedy album to reach the number one spot since Allan Sherman's My Son, the Nut in August 1963. It achieved the largest sales week for a comedy album since The Beavis and Butt-head Experience in 1994 after selling 104,700 copies during the sales week ending July 20, 2014. Prior to final figures, Yankovic was slated to sell 70,000–75,000 retail copies by the end of the tracking week, placing him just above Jason Mraz's Yes! The estimated sales figures are almost double that of sales of Alpocalypse during its first week of release in 2011. The song "Word Crimes" placed #39 on the Billboard Hot 100 for the same week, the fourth Top 40 song in Yankovic's career and making him the third artist, after Michael Jackson and Madonna, to have a Top 40 song in each of the four decades since the 1980s.

Businessweek attributed the sales success of Mandatory Fun to the viral music video campaign. ABC World News elaborated that Yankovic's success is in part due to the Internet's interest in viral and humorous videos catching up with what Yankovic has been doing for his entire career. Yankovic himself was amazed with the response he got from the album and video releases, stating that "I've been doing the same thing for 30 years and all of a sudden I'm having the best week of my life" and that he "kind of stumbled on my formula for the future". He also stated, "A No. 1 album is something I never had in my wildest dreams ever thought would be a reality." The total collection of videos had acquired more than 46 million views within 10 days of the album's release, and six of the eight videos reached the top position on the Billboard Twitter Real-Time Trending 140 chart during that week. In contrast, Yankovic's video for "Perform This Way", the lead single off Alpocalypse, only received 16.8 million views in the three years since its release, while an individual video from Mandatory Fun, like "Tacky", received 12.8 million views within the first week. His exposure on social networks jumped 3,391% between the weeks of July 7–13 and July 14–20, giving him more exposures than Beyoncé, Jay-Z, and Justin Timberlake.

== Track listing ==
Mandatory Fun track listing
No.	Title	Writer(s)	Parody of	Length
1.	"Handy"	Amethyst Kelly; Charlotte Aitchison; George Astasio; Jason Pebworth; Jonathan Shave; Kurtis McKenzie; Jon Turner; Al Yankovic	"Fancy" by Iggy Azalea featuring Charli XCX	2:56
2.	"Lame Claim to Fame"	Yankovic	Style parody of Southern Culture on the Skids	3:45
3.	"Foil"	Joel Little; Ella Yelich-O'Connor; Yankovic	"Royals" by Lorde	2:22
4.	"Sports Song"	Yankovic	Style parody of college football fight songs	2:14
5.	"Word Crimes"	Robin Thicke; Pharrell Williams; Clifford Harris Jr.; Marvin Gaye^{1}; Yankovic	"Blurred Lines" by Robin Thicke featuring T.I. and Pharrell Williams	3:43
6.	"My Own Eyes"	Yankovic	Style parody of Foo Fighters	3:40
7.	"Now That's What I Call Polka!"	Various writers: Yankovic; Ross MacLean; Arthur Richardson; Lukasz Gottwald; Maureen McDonald; Stephan Moccio; Sacha Skarbek; Henry Walter; Mark Foster; Wayne Hector; John Ryan; Edward Drewett; Julian Bunetta; Park Jai-sang; Yoo Gun-hyung; Carly Rae Jepsen; Josh Ramsay; Tavish Crowe; William Adams; Jef Martens; Jean Kouame; Walter de Backer; Luiz Bonfá; Kesha Sebert; Armando Pérez; Priscilla Hamilton; Jamie Sanderson; Breyan Isaac; Henry Walter; Lee Oskar; Keri Oskar; Greg Errico; Stefan Gordy; Skyler Gordy; David Listenbee; Erin Beck; George Robertson; Kenny Oliver; Ben Haggerty; Ryan Lewis; Thomas Bangalter; Guillaume de Homem-Christo; Williams; Nile Rodgers	A polka medley including: "Too Fat Polka" by Arthur Godfrey; "Wrecking Ball" by Miley Cyrus; "Pumped Up Kicks" by Foster the People; "Best Song Ever" by One Direction; "Gangnam Style" by Psy; "Call Me Maybe" by Carly Rae Jepsen; "Scream & Shout" by will.i.am featuring Britney Spears; "Somebody That I Used to Know" by Gotye featuring Kimbra; "Timber" by Pitbull featuring Kesha; "Sexy and I Know It" by LMFAO; "Thrift Shop" by Macklemore and Ryan Lewis featuring Wanz; "Get Lucky" by Daft Punk featuring Pharrell Williams; "Mandatory Polka" by "Weird Al" Yankovic	4:05
8.	"Mission Statement"	Yankovic	Style parody of Crosby, Stills & Nash, specifically "Carry On" and "Suite: Judy Blue Eyes"	4:28
9.	"Inactive"	Alexander Grant; Daniel Reynolds; Daniel Sermon; Benjamin McKee; Joshua Mosser; Yankovic	"Radioactive" by Imagine Dragons	2:56
10.	"First World Problems"	Yankovic	Style parody of Pixies	3:13
11.	"Tacky"	Williams; Yankovic	"Happy" by Pharrell Williams	2:53
12.	"Jackson Park Express"	Yankovic	Style parody of Cat Stevens	9:05
Total length:				45:20

== Personnel ==
The following is adapted from the album liner notes.

"Weird Al" Yankovic Band

- "Weird Al" Yankovic – production, lead vocals, accordion, keyboards, backing vocals
- Jim "Kimo" West – guitar, banjo, keyboards, vocals
- Steve Jay – bass guitar, keyboards, string arrangement, vocals
- Jon "Bermuda" Schwartz – drums, percussion, drum programming, vocals

Technical personnel

- Dave Way, Brian Warwick, Rafael Serrano – engineering
- Benny Grotto – additional production (track 10)
- Bernie Grundman – mastering

Additional performers

- Monique Donnelly – background vocals (track 3)
- James King– saxophone (track 4)
- Mike Uhler – cornet (track 4)
- Mike Bolger – tuba (track 4)
- Wayne Bergeron – trumpet (track 7)
- Joel Peskin – clarinet (track 7)
- Jim Self – tuba (track 7)
- Suzanne Yankovic – screams (track 7)
- Amanda Palmer – vocals (track 10)
- Lisa Popeil – background vocals (track 11)
- Scottie Haskell, Maxine Waters, Julia Waters – background vocals (track 12)

== Release history ==
Formats and release dates for Mandatory Fun
Region	Date	Format	Label	Catalog no.
United States	July 15, 2014	CD	RCA Records	88843-09375-2
United States	July 15, 2014	Digital download	RCA Records	None
United States	August 5, 2014	Vinyl	RCA Records	88843-09375-1
Australia	July 18, 2014	CD	RCA Records	88843-09375-2
Australia	July 18, 2014	Digital download	RCA Records	None
United Kingdom	July 15, 2014	CD	RCA Records	88843-09375-2
United Kingdom	July 15, 2014	Digital download	RCA Records	None

== Chart positions ==
=== Weekly charts ===
Weekly sales chart peaks for Mandatory Fun
Chart (2014–15)	Peak position
Australian Albums (ARIA)	9
Belgian Albums (Ultratop Flanders)	198
Canadian Albums (Billboard)	3
Dutch Albums (Album Top 100)	99
New Zealand (Recorded Music NZ)	16
UK Albums (OCC)	71
US Billboard 200	1
US Top Comedy Albums (Billboard)	1

=== Year-end charts ===
Year-end chart for Mandatory Fun
Chart (2014)	Position
US Billboard 200	89

== Notes ==
1. Gaye was not credited as a songwriter, but a court later ruled that "Blurred Lines" plagiarized Gaye's song "Got to Give It Up", and it thus must be credited on "Blurred Lines" and all derivative works, including "Word Crimes".
