= The Tissue-Culture King =

1926 English-language short story by Julian Huxley

The Tissue-Culture King (1926 in Cornhill Magazine and in The Yale Review, reprinted 1927 in Amazing Stories and many times afterwards) is a science fiction short story by biologist Julian Huxley.

The story tells of a biologist captured by an African tribe. It incorporates the idea of immortality based on reproduction from a tissue culture and genetic engineering, and an early mention of tin foil hats and their supposed anti-telepathic properties.

== Plot ==
A group of explorers of Africa stumble upon a strange two-headed toad, and that leads them to meet an endocrinologist, Dr. Hascombe. Captured by an African tribe, Dr. Hascombe saves himself by using "magical" powers of modern biology.

== Critical evaluation ==
Patrick Parrinder considers the story as an allegory to the servile place of science within a capitalist political world.
