= Black helicopter =

Symbol of an alleged conspiratorial military takeover or presence of UFOs

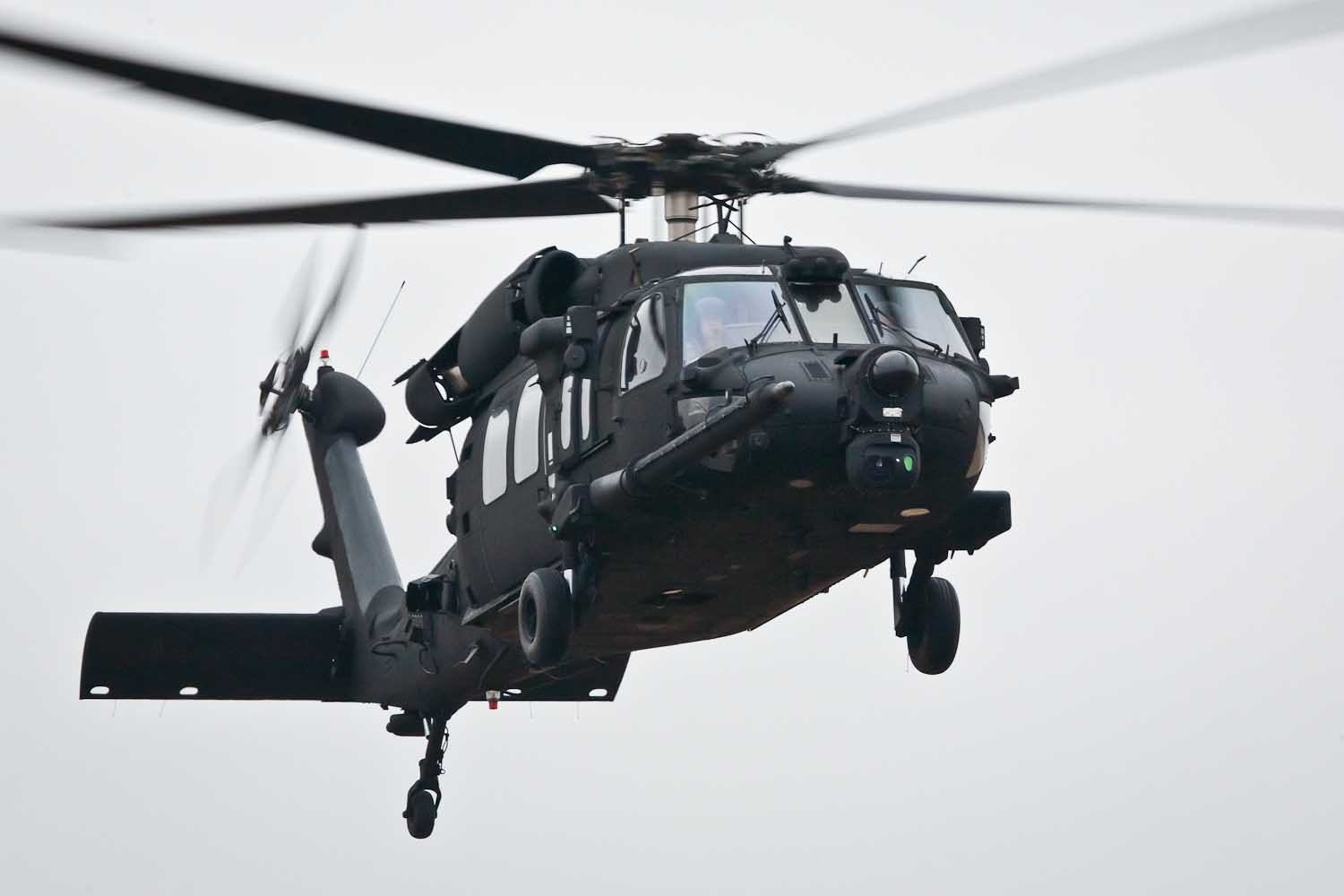
Unmarked black helicopters have been described in conspiracy theories since the 1970s.

The black helicopter is a symbol of an alleged conspiratorial military takeover of the United States in the American militia movement. Black helicopters have also been associated with UFOs, especially in the UK, men in black, and similar conspiracy theories.

== Overview ==
Stories of black helicopters first appeared in the 1970s, and were linked to reports of cattle mutilation.

Jim Keith wrote two books on the subject: Black Helicopters Over America: Strikeforce for the New World Order (1995), and Black Helicopters II: The End Game Strategy (1998).

Media attention to black helicopters increased in February 1995, when first-term Republican northern Idaho Representative Helen Chenoweth charged that armed federal agents were landing black helicopters on Idaho ranchers' property to enforce the Endangered Species Act. "I have never seen them", Chenoweth said in an interview in The New York Times. "But enough people in my district have become concerned that I can't just ignore it. We do have some proof."

The black helicopters conjecture resonates well with the belief held by some in the militia movement that troops from the United Nations might invade the United States. The John Birch Society originally promoted it, asserting that a United Nations force would soon arrive in black helicopters to bring the US under UN control. A similar theory concerning so-called "phantom helicopters" appeared in the UK in the 1970s.

== Documented usage ==
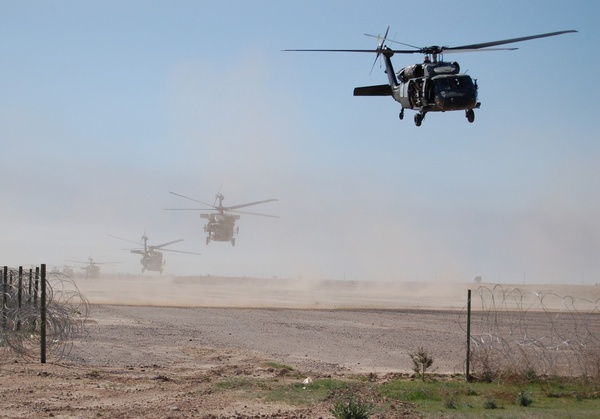
Sikorsky UH-60 Black Hawk helicopters flying in Iraq

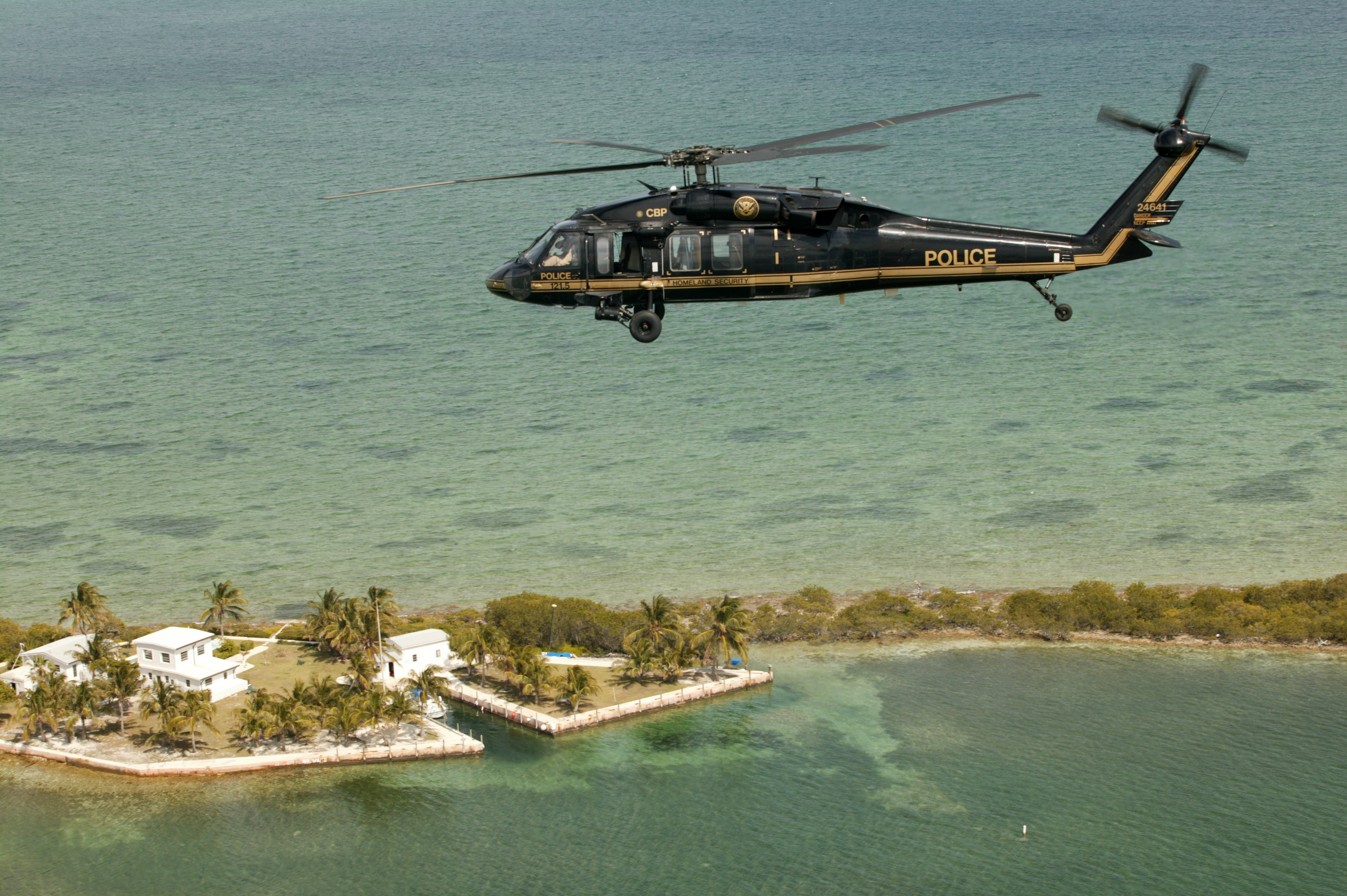
U.S. Customs and Border Protection uses black UH-60 helicopters with gold markings.

The following organizations and government agencies are known to operate black and/or unmarked helicopters in the United States for unclassified uses:

- U.S. Customs and Border Protection operates a dozen black-and-gold UH-60 Black Hawk helicopters.
- The U.S. Army's 160th Special Operations Aviation Regiment uses helicopters primarily painted black and other U.S. military branches operate helicopters painted in black or dark colors, particularly the Sikorsky MH-53, which was optimized for long-range stealthy insertion and extraction of personnel, including combat search and rescue. The U.S. Army regularly conducts both exercises and operational missions in American airspace. Some of these exercises have taken place in densely populated cities, including Los Angeles, New York, Detroit, San Francisco, New Orleans, Chicago, and Washington, D.C. Most operational missions are tasked with narcotics interdiction in the American Southwest and out of Florida and Puerto Rico. By extensive use of IR, radar, GPS and night vision devices, as well as other classified means, they are able to fly in zero visibility conditions with no running lights. Their frequent use results in frequent sightings by concerned members of the public.
- In the early 1970s, Air America (a former dummy corporation airline covertly operated on behalf of the CIA under the cover of a private commercial venture) conducted test flights of two highly modified black Hughes OH-6 Cayuse helicopters at Culver City, California. After the mission assigned to it had been completed, one helicopter was transferred to the ownership of the Pacific Corporation of Washington, D.C. The second helicopter currently flies for the Snohomish County Sheriff's Office in Washington State.
- Many defense contractors and helicopter manufacturers also conduct public flight testing of aircraft and components or fly aircraft in public view to test ranges or other corporate airfields for training or demonstrations. Occasionally, some of these aircraft will be made for military clients and are painted in black or dark colors.
- Many U.S. law enforcement agencies use black helicopters for surveillance, transportation, and patrol. Some of the agencies that use them are Immigration and Customs Enforcement, the U.S. Marshals Service, the Drug Enforcement Administration, and the Federal Bureau of Investigation.

== Pejorative term ==
The term has also been used to ridicule other conspiracy theories or conspiracy theorists:

- In 2007, a Slate article on the 2007 NBA betting scandal said, "In the wake of this scandal, every game will be in question, and not only by fans disposed to seeing black helicopters outside the arena."
- In 2013, Vice President Joe Biden used the term in a speech responding to the National Rifle Association of America during the White House campaign for background checks on all gun purchasers, saying, "The black helicopter crowd is really upset. It's kind of scary, man."
- In 2018, the United States Department of Homeland Security proposed a database to monitor the activities of journalists, bloggers and other “media influencers". In response to concerns, DHS's spokesman said, "Despite what some reporters may suggest, this is nothing more than the standard practice of monitoring current events in the media. Any suggestion otherwise is fit for tin foil hat-wearing, black helicopter conspiracy theorists."
- In 2020, Governor of Florida Ron DeSantis, in a public appearance with U.S. Vice President Mike Pence, pushed back on critics of his administration in its handling of the COVID-19 pandemic, saying, "We succeeded, and I think that people just don't want to recognize it, because it challenges their narrative, it challenges their assumption, so they got to try to find a boogeyman – maybe it's that there are black helicopters circling the Department of Health. If you believe that, um, I got a bridge in Brooklyn to sell you."

== In popular culture ==
- In Capricorn One, astronauts Robert Caulfield and Charles Brubaker escape from a U.S. government facility after being forced to fake a Mars landing, and are pursued by a pair of black OH-6 Cayuse helicopters.
- In Escape from New York, the United States is portrayed as a complete police state by 1997. The United States Police Force (USPF) uses black helicopters to patrol the border walls of Manhattan island, now a prison penal colony. The USPF is also shown using the helicopters to perform extractions, surveillance, and to kill inmates attempting to escape. In its sequel, Escape from L.A., the USPF helicopters are more futuristic in form and function with folding rotors that retract into the top after landing.
- In Blue Thunder, the protagonist, police helicopter pilot Frank Murphy, uncovers a conspiracy to stir up riots in urban ghettos as a pretext for declaring a national emergency in order to establish a dictatorship, using black helicopters to subdue the population.
- Airwolf revolves around an advanced black-colored helicopter used by "The Firm" to conduct espionage missions both abroad and within the United States.
- In Amerika, a television miniseries in which the Soviet Union has taken over the United States, black helicopters are used to intimidate and subdue the American population. Additionally, the invasion of the United States is conducted under the pretext of a United Nations peacekeeping mission using said helicopters.
- In The X-Files, unmarked black helicopters also play a key role in the finale episodes of season two and nine, involving the Cigarette Smoking Man. In the film The X-Files: Fight the Future, black helicopters pursue Fox Mulder and Dana Scully after they uncover a conspiracy to use bees to carry an extraterrestrial virus. The TV series' soundtrack album included a song, "Unmarked Helicopters", centered on the concept.
- In King of the Hill, conspiracy theorist Dale Gribble discusses "stealth helicopters with computerized noise-canceling capability".
- In Conspiracy Theory, the protagonist, conspiracy theorist Jerry Fletcher, describes silent black military helicopters to an empty cab (not realizing his fare already left). Fletcher is later pursued by individuals who rappel down from such a helicopter.
- In the South Park series premiere "Cartman Gets an Anal Probe", farmer Bill Denkins tells Officer Barbrady that there have been recent sightings of UFOs and black helicopters. Barbrady dismisses his concerns, but black helicopters fly behind him, which he dismisses as pigeons flying.
- In Deus Ex, the protagonist, JC Denton, uses a black helicopter as a primary means of transport. The series itself is strongly inspired by conspiracy theories such as black helicopters, and references them frequently.
- In The Secret World, black helicopters with red-tinted canopies owned by the Orochi Group appear at multiple points in the game, most notably in the Kingsmouth Town area, which includes a quest called "Black Helicopters".
- In the video game adaptation of the 2007 film Spider-Man 3, after J. Jonah Jameson is kidnapped by a supervillain called the Mad Bomber in a black helicopter, Spider-Man replies, "guess those black helicopter conspiracy theories were true!"
- "Weird Al" Yankovic mentions "black helicopters coming 'cross the border" in his song "Foil" (a parody of Lorde's song "Royals"), which starts as an advertisement for aluminum foil and devolves into a conspiracy rant.
- In Grand Theft Auto IV, the Annihilator helicopter—used by the Liberty City Police Department and the National Office of Security Enforcement (NOOSE)—is a black, heavily armed aircraft modelled after the Sikorsky UH-60 Black Hawk. The vehicle serves as GTA IV's primary attack helicopter and a spiritual successor to the Raindance from Grand Theft Auto: San Andreas, reflecting recurring themes of state power and surveillance in the series.
- In Grand Theft Auto Online, during an "Operation Paper Trail" storyline mission where the player flies a black-painted helicopter, Agent ULP of the International Affairs Agency (IAA; the Grand Theft Auto universe's satirical CIA equivalent) fondly recalls flying black helicopters early in his career—not as part of any conspiracies, but to draw conspiracy theorists away from actual IAA conspiracies.

== See also ==
- Black Volga
- Cattle mutilation
- List of conspiracy theories
- Stealth helicopter
