= Foil (song) =

Song by "Weird Al" Yankovic

from the album Mandatory Fun
- Released: July 15, 2014
- Genre: Parody
- Length: 2:23
- Label: RCA
- Songwriters: Ella Yelich O'Connor; Joel Little; Al Yankovic
- Producer: "Weird Al" Yankovic

"Foil" is a song by American satirical singer "Weird Al" Yankovic from his fourteenth studio album, Mandatory Fun (2014). The song is a parody of the 2013 single "Royals" by Lorde. It begins as an ode to the uses of aluminum foil for food storage, but becomes a parody of conspiracy theories, the New World Order, and the Illuminati in its second verse. "Foil" received positive reviews from music critics, and peaked at number three on the Billboard Comedy Digital Tracks. The song's music video stars Yankovic as the host of a cooking show, and features cameo appearances from Patton Oswalt, Tom Lennon, and Robert Benjamin Garant.

== Background and composition ==
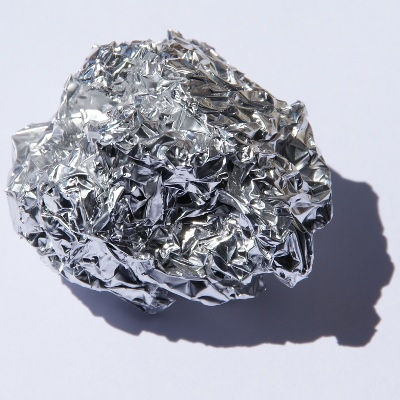
An image of aluminum foil, the song's namesake

"Foil" is a parody of Lorde's 2013 single "Royals". He mimics Lorde's "sultry croon". At two minutes and 23 seconds, it is the shortest parody on Mandatory Fun due to its omission of the bridge and final chorus from the original track. In an interview with Billboard, Lorde said Yankovic "asked ages ago if he could do it” and she agreed to his offer. Lorde enjoyed Yankovic's music, specifically his parody of "Confessions" (2004) by Usher.

The song opens with Yankovic lamenting that he cannot finish food at restaurants, opting for a doggy bag. The first verse and chorus expand upon the usage of aluminum foil for food storage and preventing food spoilage, which Yankovic deems better than other food storage options such as "Tupperware containers". In a twist, the second verse discusses conspiracy theories; in particular, he mentions the Illuminati, shadow organizations, "black helicopters comin' cross the border", the New World Order and reinforces the belief that the Moon landings were staged; all this ties into the song's theme through the figure of the tinfoil hat associated with conspiracy theorists. Yankovic planned to incorporate a twist in the song while outlining ideas. To conclude the song, Yankovic supports the benefits of aluminum foil by placing a tin foil hat atop his head to shield himself from "thought control rays" and "psychotronic scanning".

== Reception ==
"Foil" received positive reviews from music critics. Randall Roberts of Los Angeles Times deemed the song a highlight of Mandatory Fun. Consequence of Sound writer Henry Hauser noted that it could have been included in his 1993 record The Food Album. Kenneth Partridge of Billboard wrote that while both "Tacky" (2014) and "Foil" could have been "one-joke affairs", they were both successful. The song received a nomination for Best Individual Performance at the 2015 Webby Awards, but lost to "If Google Was a Guy" by CollegeHumor. Other critics were less positive. Paste considered "Foil" to be less clever than the other parodies on Mandatory Fun. Ben Kaye, writing for Consequence of Sound, praised the first half of the track, but criticized the "weird switch to Illuminati jokes". Commercially, "Foil" peaked at number three on the Billboard Comedy Digital Tracks.

== Music video ==

The video for "Foil" (pictured bottom) was compared to "Royals" (pictured top) for the artists' similar hair style and background setting.

The music video for "Foil" was released on July 16, 2014, through CollegeHumor's YouTube channel. It was part of an eight video series, released once per day, produced for Mandatory Fun. "Foil" was the most successful video, attracting 11 million views in five days.

The video begins with Yankovic singing straight into the camera as a waiter gives him a doggy bag. Throughout the sequence, he spoofs Lorde's "on-camera intensity"; Breanna Ehrlich of MTV News also observed that the video highlights the similarity between Yankovic and Lorde's hair styles. He then walks out of a restaurant and onto the set of a cooking program titled Now We're Cookin'!. L.V. Anderson of Slate described his role in the video as an "infomercial huckster". During the chorus, three female backup singers dressed in silvery outfits appear as they echo the song's lyrics.

The lights then dim as Yankovic sings about conspiracy theories; the camera shows the director (played by Patton Oswalt) watching "in horror". Stock footage of the Eye of Providence, an atomic bomb explosion, a set of military helicopters, troops marching, and police men in riot shields is shown. Yankovic looks into a fisheye lens camera in static filter and twice a man with a bloody face quickly appears on screen. The following scene proceeds to show a video of a staged Moon landing and thought control rays. Two men in black suits (played by Tom Lennon and Robert Ben Garant) insert a sleep injection into Yankovic's neck and drag him off set as the song ends. The video ends with Oswalt taking off his human mask to reveal the face of a reptilian humanoid.

== Live performances ==
Yankovic performed "Foil" as part of the Mandatory World Tour (2015–2016). The live version replicates the majority of the music video, with Yankovic behind a Now We're Cookin'! table and accompanied by various props including a roll of aluminum foil, a teapot, and a foil hat. For some international performances, Yankovic changed the pronunciation of "aluminum" to "aluminium" to reflect the different ending being commonplace outside of North America. Orlando Weekly noted that "Foil" was one of two "special moments during a show that was nonstop and insanely memorable mayhem".

== Weekly chart positions ==
Chart (2014)	Peak position
US Comedy Digital Tracks (Billboard)	3
