= First World Problems (song) =

Song by "Weird Al" Yankovic

from the album Mandatory Fun
- Released: July 15, 2014
- Studio: Way Station, GoDaveyGo Studio and Bedrock L.A. (Los Angeles, California) Mad Oak Studios (Allston, Massachusetts)
- Genre: Rock
- Length: 3:14
- Label: RCA Records
- Songwriter: "Weird Al" Yankovic

Music video
- "First World Problems” on YouTube

"First World Problems" is a song by the American parody artist and satirist "Weird Al" Yankovic from his 2014 studio album Mandatory Fun. The song is a pastiche of the music of the Pixies, particularly the songs "Debaser" and "No. 13 Baby".

== Background ==
In 2014, when the song released, Yankovic stated in an interview with Newsweek, "I've been a fan of Pixies for a very long time. In fact I got to play with Pixies a couple years ago at a benefit concert. That was a huge moment in my life. That got me thinking, I should do a Pixies pastiche."

== Reception ==
The Verge described the song as being "a list of Twitter rants", with many of the topics in the song being topical at the time of the song's release.

== Music video ==
The music video, directed by Liam Lynch, shows Yankovic dressed up, mad at various things mentioned in the lyrics. In an interview with PopCrush around the time of the song's release, Yankovic said, "So we thought, 'OK, we'll find you a douchey blonde wig … [which was made of] real human hair … and I tried it on, and it fit, and we had fun with it!". In an interview with Rolling Stone, he said, "I told [director Liam Lynch] that I didn’t want to be myself; I wasn't Weird Al in this video — I was kind of like this douchey character."

== Personnel ==
Personnel taken from the liner notes of Mandatory Fun.

- "Weird Al" Yankovic – lead and backing vocals
- Jim "Kimo" West – guitar
- Steve Jay – bass
- Jon "Bermuda" Schwartz – drums

Additional personnel

- Amanda Palmer – female backing vocals
