= Tin foil hat =

Hat and stereotype for conspiracy theorists

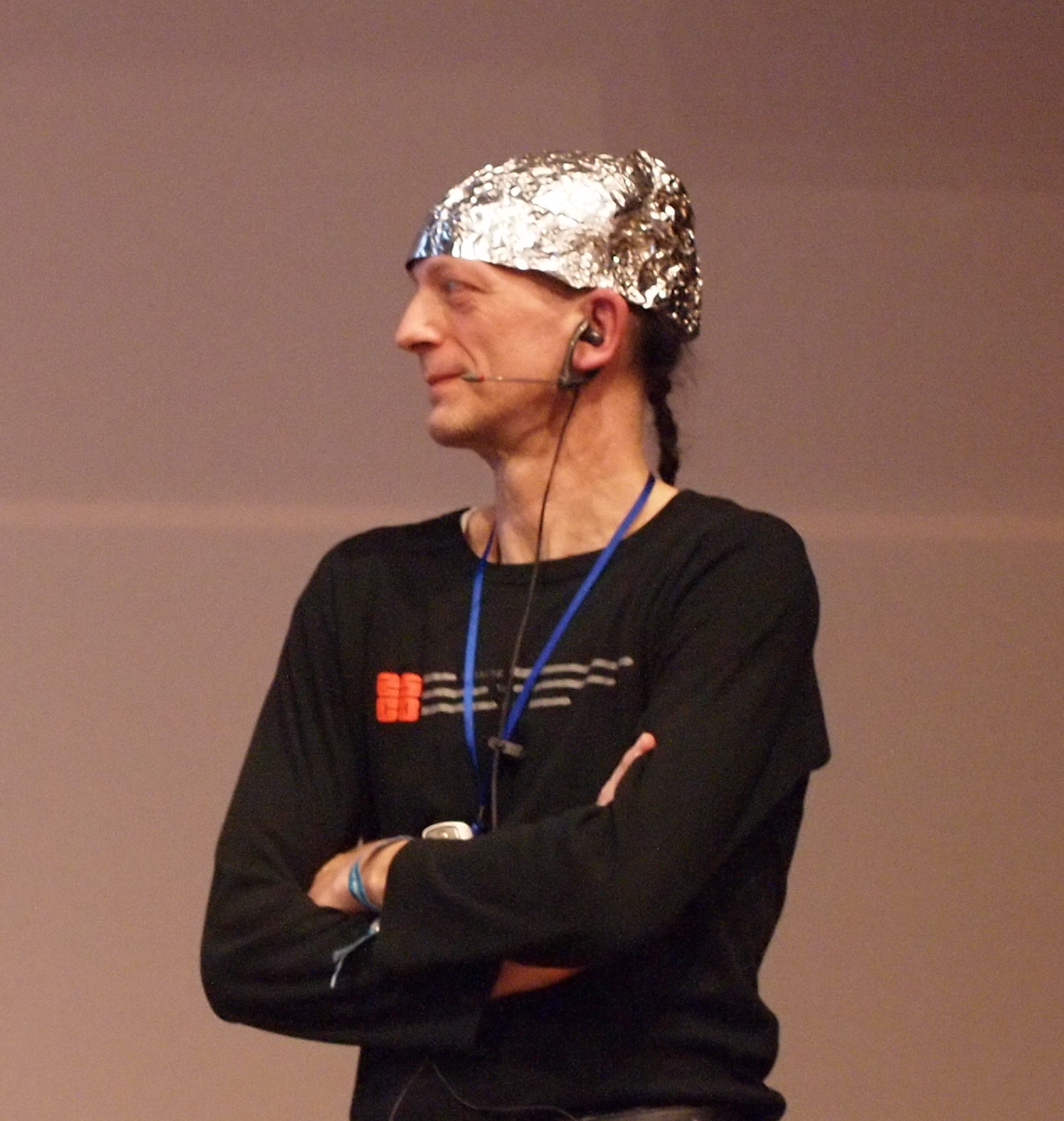
Man in a tin foil hat at the Chaos Communication Congress

A tin foil hat is a hat made from one or more sheets of tin foil or aluminium foil, or a piece of conventional headgear lined with foil, often worn in the belief or hope that it shields the brain from threats such as electromagnetic fields, mind control, and mind reading. The notion of wearing homemade headgear for such protection has become a popular stereotype and byword for paranoia, persecutory delusions, and belief in pseudoscience and conspiracy theories.

"Tin foil" is a common misnomer for aluminium foil in English-speaking countries; packaging metal foil was formerly made out of tin before it was replaced with aluminium.

== Origin ==
A common delusion in schizophrenia is that others are influencing the sufferer's thoughts. James Tilly Matthews in 1797 complained of a machine he called an "Air Loom" influencing him, becoming one of the first documented cases. The common delusion was characterized in depth in the 1918 work 'On the Origin of the "Influencing Machine" in Schizophrenia'. Some people – modernly called "Tin Foil Hatters" – have a belief that such hats prevent mind control by governments, spies, mobsters, corporations, extraterrestrial, or paranormal beings that employ ESP or the microwave auditory effect. People in many countries who believe they are "targeted individuals", subject to government, corporate, or criminal spying or harassment, have developed websites, conference calls, and support meetings to discuss their concerns, including the idea of protective headgear.

An early allusion to an "insulative electrical contrivance encircling the head during thought" occurs in the unusual 1909 non-fiction publication Atomic Consciousness by self-proclaimed "seer" John Palfrey (aka "James Bathurst") who believed such headgear was not effective for his "retention of thoughts and ideas" against a supposed "telepathic impactive impingement". Vice Magazine writes that the tin foil hat in popular culture "can be traced back in a very weird and prescient short story written in 1927 by Julian Huxley" titled "The Tissue-Culture King", wherein the main character uses a metal hat to prevent being mind controlled by the villain scientist. Over time the term tin foil hat has become associated with paranoia and conspiracy theories.

== Scientific analysis ==
Effects of strong electromagnetic radiation on health have been documented for quite some time. The efficiency of a metal enclosure in blocking electromagnetic radiation depends on the thickness of the foil, as dictated by the "skin depth" of the conductor for a particular wave frequency range of the radiation. For half-millimetre-thick aluminum foil, radiation above about 20 kHz (i.e., including both AM and FM bands) would be partially blocked, although aluminum foil is not sold in this thickness, so numerous layers of foil would be required to achieve this effect.

Allan H. Frey discovered in 1962 that the microwave auditory effect (i.e., the sounds induced by the reception of radio-frequency electromagnetic signals, heard as clicks and buzzes) can be blocked by a patch of wire mesh (rather than foil) placed above the temporal lobe. A tongue-in-cheek experimental study by a group of MIT students in 2005 found that tin foil hats do shield their wearers from radio waves over most of the tested spectrum, but amplified certain frequencies, around 2.6 GHz and 1.2 GHz.

== In popular culture ==
Still from the 1983 film Lovesick.

Fans of the band Devo was associated with tin foil hats, with the band sporting satirical "Energy dome" hats they called Orgone collectors.

In 1982, a police dispatcher shared a tale of recommending a tin foil hat to a caller who complained of invisible death rays. That same year, the image of the paranoiac in protective tin foil hat was committed to film; in the resultant 1983 movie, titled Lovesick, Dudley Moore similarly plays a psychiatrist who, in one scene, wins the trust of a paranoid patient by providing him with tin foil headpiece as a protection against "sinster rays" that are "scrambling his brain". Moore's psychiatrist character explains "Mr. Zuckerman (David Strathairn) feels that there are these sinister rays and voices beaming into his head from the top of the World Trade Center and scrambling his brains, with a result that he has been unable to secure other employment."

Another news story told of tin foil used to "block out microwaves", while a story on crack cocaine told of a paranoid user who wore a hat to protect from rays.

In "Future Boy", a 1991 episode of Quantum Leap, the hero must prevent the long-term psychiatric hospitalization of an eccentric (Richard Herd) who wears a foil hat in the shape of a pyramid that "generates positive energy". In 1999, discussion of black helicopters was dismissed with an allusion to tin foil hats, while others began to speak of "lunatics" in tin-foil hats or "sleeping under a railway bridge to keep the alien signals out of my brain".

Tin foil hats have appeared in such films as Signs (2002), Noroi: The Curse (2005), and Futurama: Into the Wild Green Yonder (2009). The 2019 HBO television series Watchmen features the character Wade Tillman/Looking Glass, a police officer who wears a mask made of reflective foil, and while off-duty, a cap lined in foil to protect his mind from alien psychic attacks.

American comedy musician "Weird Al" Yankovic referenced the concept in his 2014 song "Foil", a parody of the song "Royals" by Lorde. Yankovic begins the parody by discussing the merit of the use of aluminum foil for its uses for food preservation, before abruptly segueing into a discussion about various conspiracy theories and the necessity of protection using a tin foil hat.

Several teachers in Russia's Voronezh Oblast reportedly posed in pictures with tin foil hats in 2024, due a prank by a Belarusian prankster Vladislav Bokhan, who posed as an official from United Russia. He sent an "order" to local schools asking teachers to hold a "Helmet of the Fatherland" workshop, which contained instructions for making tin foil hats as a "patriotic campaign" and to "defend themselves from the irradiation from NATO satellites". The local branch of the Russian Ministry of Education commended the teachers for demonstrating "patriotic spirit, strong dedication, and a creative approach to any task", despite it being a prank.

== See also ==
- 5G conspiracy theories
- Brainwashing
- Denpa, a Japanese term that includes those who believe they are being persecuted by electromagnetic waves
- Electronic harassment – Delusion regarding mind manipulation by electronic means
- Electromagnetic hypersensitivity
- Faraday cage – Enclosure of conductive mesh used to block electric fields
- The Hum – Low-frequency noise not audible to all people
- List of hat styles
- Microwave auditory effect – Concept in human perception of sound
- "On the Origin of the 'Influencing Machine' in Schizophrenia" – 1919 article in psychoanalysis
- Thought broadcasting – Delusion that others can hear one's thoughts
- Thought insertion – Delusional belief that thoughts have been inserted into one's mind
- Bioelectromagnetics – Study of electromagnetic fields and biological entity interaction
- Magnetobiology – Study of biological effects of magnetic fields
