= Handy (song) =

Song by "Weird Al" Yankovic

Song by "Weird Al" Yankovic

from the album Mandatory Fun
- Released: July 15, 2014
- Recorded: June 2014; Bedrock L.A. (Los Angeles, California)
- Genre: Comedy rap
- Length: 2:56
- Label: RCA
- Songwriters: Amethyst Kelly; Charlotte Aitchison; George Astasio; Jason Pebworth; Jonathan Shave; Kurtis McKenzie; Jon Turner; Al Yankovic
- Producer: "Weird Al" Yankovic

"Handy" is a song by American musician "Weird Al" Yankovic from his fourteenth studio album, Mandatory Fun (2014). The song is a parody of the 2014 single "Fancy" by Iggy Azalea, featuring Charli XCX. Yankovic met Azalea in person for permission to spoof the song, and he completed his track shortly before the album was mastered and released. "Handy" focuses on a character who brags about his abilities regarding various handyman tasks. The music video was released on July 17, 2014 and features Yankovic assuming the character portrayed in the song. "Handy" received a mixed response from music critics.

== Recording ==
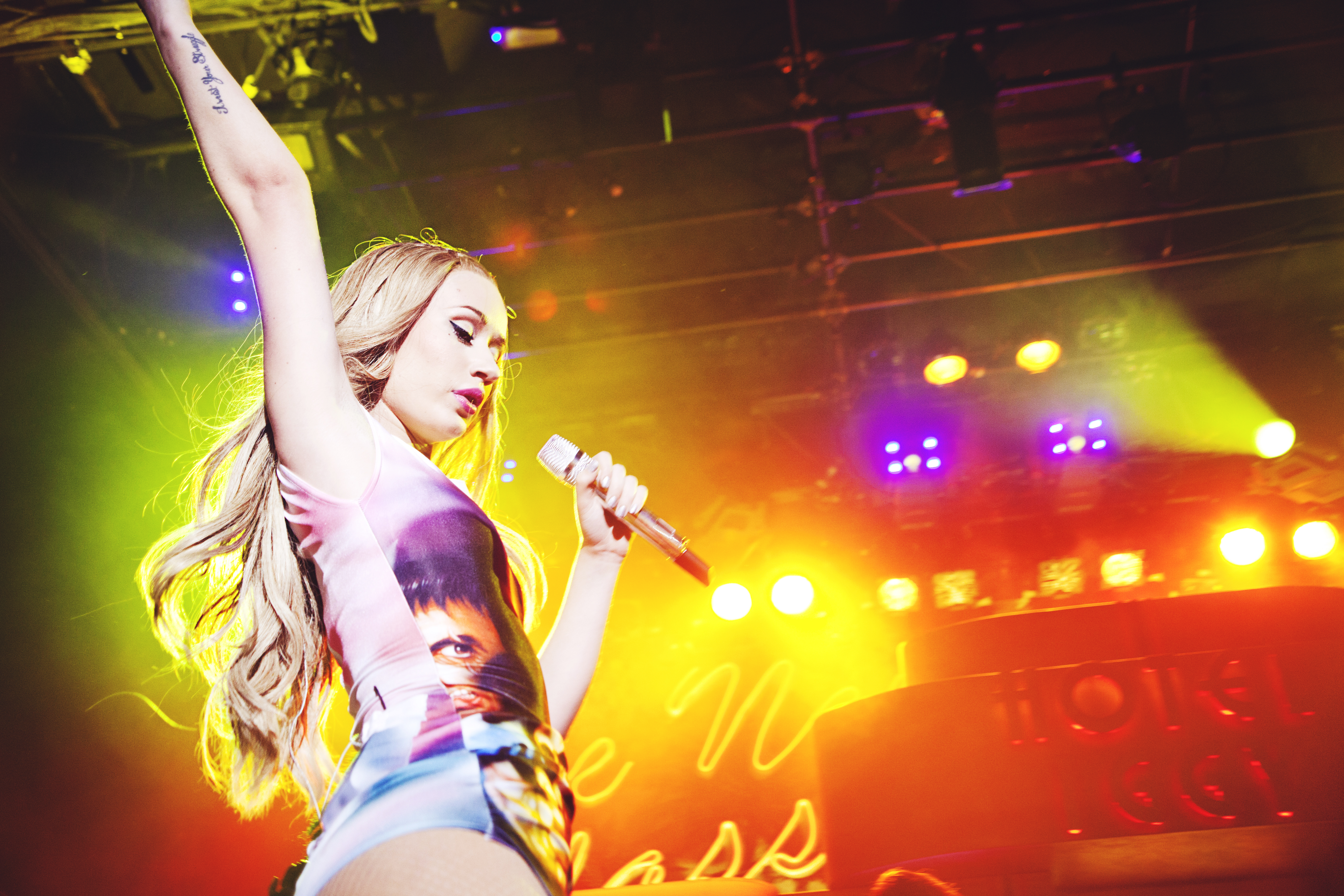
Yankovic approached Iggy Azalea in person for permission to parody her song "Fancy".

Eleven tracks had been completed for Mandatory Fun and a deadline had been set for the album release, but Yankovic wished to add a "big hit of the summer" to the set. He recalled that he determined the saturation point of "Fancy" by asking his daughter: "I said, 'Are they talking about Iggy Azalea at school?' And she says, 'Well, not so much.' I asked the same thing two weeks later and she said, 'Oh yeah, that's all they're talking about now!'" He then traveled from Los Angeles, California to Denver, Colorado to ask Azalea permission to parody her song. On June 7, 2014, Yankovic was backstage at KS107.5's Summer Jam where Azalea was set to perform. He explained in a radio interview at the event that if his request was approved, he would record his parody the next day.

Yankovic learned through a promoter that Azalea would be unable to speak to him at the venue, since she was preparing for her show. He was also told that the next opportunity to meet her would be in the United Kingdom; Yankovic felt this was "crazy" and decided to approach her directly. The encounter was described by TMZ as an "ambush" as Yankovic presented the potential parody lyrics to Azalea. He later clarified that the meeting was much more polite and blown out of proportion by TMZ. Yankovic also noted that meeting a spoof target in person is not his usual method for obtaining permission, but was necessary in this instance to meet the album deadline. "Handy" was recorded in June, and Yankovic announced that the album mastering process was complete that same month.

== Composition ==
"Handy" is performed from the point of view of a person described in a Billboard review as "the world's most braggadocious contractor". The character portrayed in the song rhymes about various handyman tasks including installing countertops, tile floors, and repairing leaf blowers. The Wire noted that the only direct connection between the character and Azalea is the line "I got 99 problems but a switch ain't one", which refers to Azalea's appearance in the song "Problem". Allmusic noted that by focusing on its craftsman theme, the song "does a complete 180 thematically" from the original "Fancy".

== Music video ==
Yankovic's publisher RCA Records opted not to finance any music videos for Mandatory Fun. Instead, Yankovic turned to various social media portals that helped to cover the production cost, with Yankovic foregoing any ad video revenue. This release strategy was considered by The Atlantic a "web-enabled precision video delivery operation, and evidence of some serious digital distributional forethought" as it allows the videos to be seen by different sets of audiences for each site.

The music video for "Handy" was released on July 17, 2014 through Yahoo! Screen's "Sketchy" channel, and is presented in the style of a late-night informercial with Yankovic performing as a residential general contractor. He is dressed as the character Schneider (played by Pat Harrington) from the 1970s television show One Day at a Time. The video includes appearances by Eddie Pepitone, Justin Giddings, and Ted Hollis.

== Reception ==
Billboard expressed that while "Handy" opens with a "weak opening line", the rest of the song explores creative directions. A review by The Wire felt that the parody features clever lyrics, but "isn't quite catchy enough to be a hit". The A.V. Club called it "a meticulous ape" of the original song, pointing out the electronic production and Yankovic's vocal delivery. Consequence of Sound questioned the lyrical subject matter by stating, "Really, who's going to get many laughs out of 'Handy' apart from that nonexistent cross-section of Bob Vila and Iggy Azalea fans?" The Arizona Republic ranked it the least of Yankovic's eight video-featured songs of the album, stating that while Yankovic's accent on the song is humorous, "The lyrics aren't as funny as the accent or the video." In an Exclaim! review, Vish Khanna highlighted song's theme and drew a parallel between craftsmen and Yankovic's profession as a parodist: "In a sense, this is what Yankovic does with other people's inventions; he tweaks them hard enough so that they might just be a little bit better."

== Chart positions ==
Chart (2014)	Peak position
Comedy Digital Tracks (Billboard)	5

== See also ==
- List of songs by "Weird Al" Yankovic
