= Tacky (song) =

2014 song by "Weird Al" Yankovic

Song by "Weird Al" Yankovic

from the album Mandatory Fun
- Released: July 15, 2014
- Recorded: April 2014; Bedrock L.A. (Los Angeles, California)
- Genre: Comedy; parody; soul
- Length: 2:53
- Label: RCA
- Songwriters: Pharrell Williams; Al Yankovic
- Producer: "Weird Al" Yankovic

Music video
- "Tacky" on YouTube

"Tacky" is a song by American musician "Weird Al" Yankovic from his fourteenth studio album, Mandatory Fun (2014). The song is a parody of the 2013 single "Happy" by Pharrell Williams. The song mocks questionable style in fashion as well as activities considered gauche. Yankovic recorded the song as one of the last on Mandatory Fun, and received Williams' approval directly, through email. He remarked he was "honored" to have his work spoofed by Yankovic.

The song's one-shot music video parodies "Happy", and was the first in a series of eight videos released over eight days in promotion of Mandatory Fun. It features cameo appearances by Aisha Tyler, Margaret Cho, Eric Stonestreet, Kristen Schaal, and Jack Black, and was produced by Nerdist Industries.

== Background ==
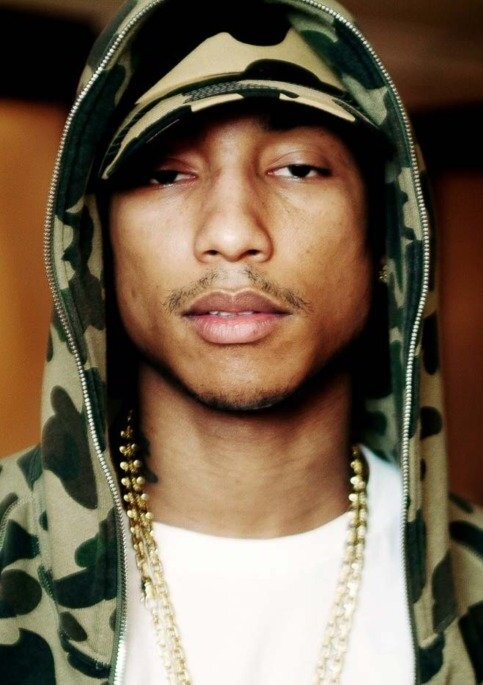
Pharrell Williams was "honored" to give Yankovic permission to use his song "Happy".

As usual for him, Yankovic sought permission from the original artists for his parodies on Mandatory Fun; in contrast to previous albums, he had few difficulties in obtaining these. Yankovic stated "This is the first time where I've gotten everybody that I wanted, and I couldn't be happier about it." He was able to get Pharrell Williams' permission for three of the songs he represented on the album, Williams' "Happy", Robin Thicke's "Blurred Lines" (which was also parodied, as "Word Crimes"), and Daft Punk's "Get Lucky" (which was part of the "Now That's What I Call Polka!" medley), through a personal email to the artist after Yankovic's manager had difficulty working this with Williams' manager; according to Yankovic, Williams was "honored" to have his work used by Yankovic. The song was recorded in April 2014.

== Composition ==
The song mocks people whose actions and style are generally considered gauche. The singer boasts of having no shame; he seems proud of his gaudy attire (fluorescent-orange pants with an Ed Hardy shirt, pink Crocs with sequins, Ugg boots with glitter), as well as his breaches of deportment (example: asking a woman whether she's fat or pregnant; gorging an entire bowl of after-dinner mints at a restaurant; and using coupons on a date). Reviews noted that the song lists various disruptive acts associated with social media, referencing Instagram, Twitter, and Yelp. Yankovic mentions printing his résumé in Comic Sans, a much-reviled font, and states that he would live-tweet during a funeral and take selfies with the deceased.

== Music video ==
The music video for "Tacky" debuted on July 14, 2014, as the first in an eight-video series. Produced by Nerdist Industries, the one-shot video shows Yankovic mimicking Williams' own style used in his video for "Happy": It features comedians Aisha Tyler, Margaret Cho, Eric Stonestreet, Kristen Schaal, and Jack Black dressed in tacky clothes and purposely dancing badly while lip-syncing to the song's lyrics about a person who brags on about his questionable style choices. The video was filmed at Palace Theatre in downtown Los Angeles, previously featured as Julianne Moore’s character's apartment in the 1998 film The Big Lebowski. Yankovic specified that during each of the six continuous takes, he would have to rush down five flights of stairs while changing his outfit in order to appear in the beginning and end of the video.

== Reception ==
Rolling Stone reviewed the song "Tacky", stating that "Weird Al is in fine form throughout the track". In their review of Mandatory Fun, the publication wrote: "Sure, there’s a touch of hypocrisy in a guy as gloriously tacky as Al taking shots at the shameless but who really cares when it's this much fun." ABC News wrote that "the parody and musicianship are spot-on, aided by an instantly classic music video". Billboard noted that the song had the potential of being a "one-joke affair", but exceeded these expectations.

== Weekly chart positions ==
Chart (2014)	Peak position
US Comedy Digital Tracks (Billboard)	2

== See also ==
- List of songs by "Weird Al" Yankovic
