= Word Crimes =

2014 song by "Weird Al" Yankovic

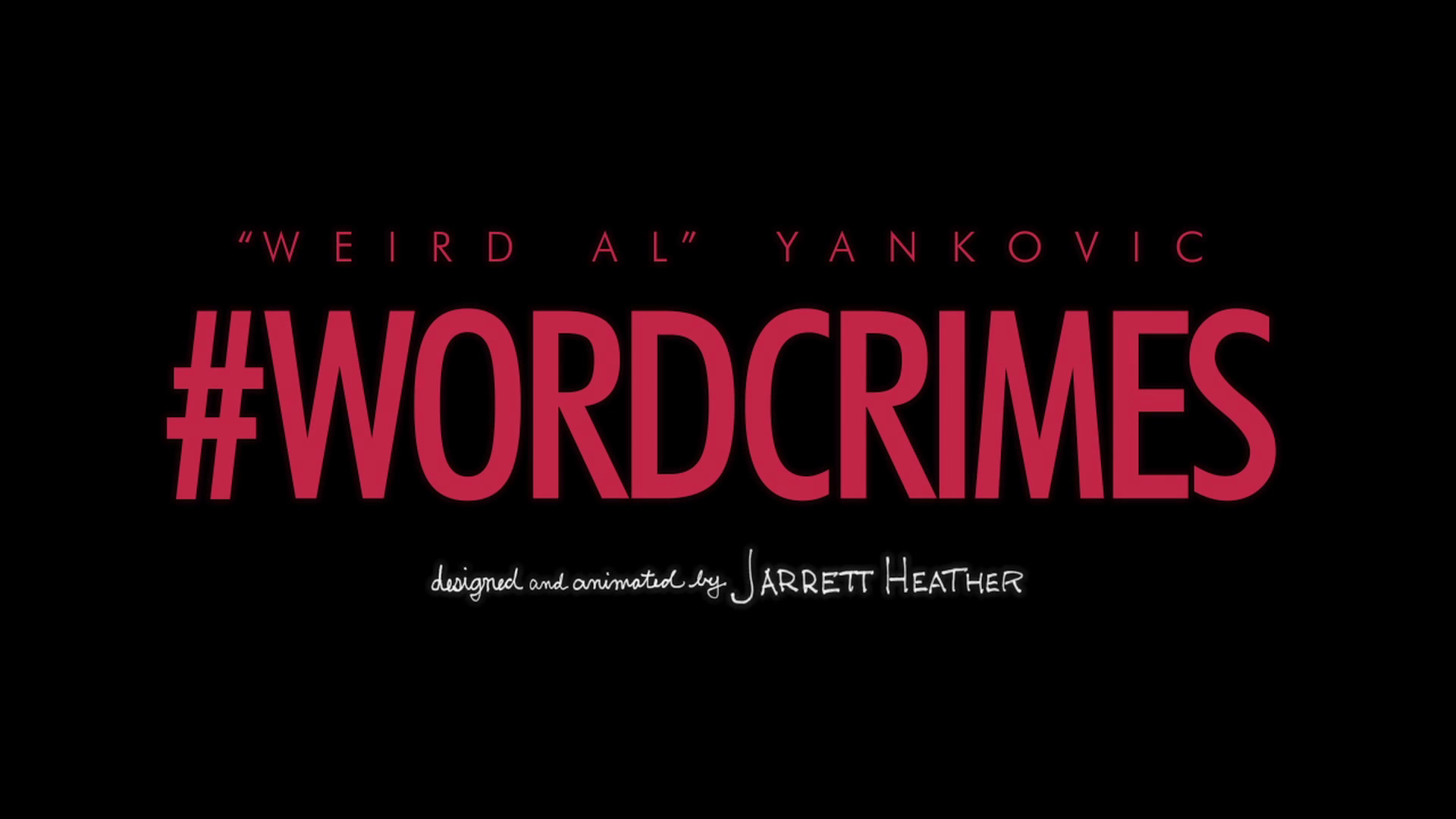
- The title card for the "Word Crimes" video

Song by "Weird Al" Yankovic

from the album Mandatory Fun
- Released: July 15, 2014
- Recorded: December 2013; Bedrock L.A. (Los Angeles, California)
- Genre: Comedy; parody; R&B; disco
- Length: 3:43
- Label: RCA
- Songwriters: Pharrell Williams; Clifford Harris, Jr.; Robin Thicke; Marvin Gaye^{1}; Al Yankovic
- Producer: "Weird Al" Yankovic

Music video
- "Word Crimes" on YouTube

"Word Crimes" is a song by American musician "Weird Al" Yankovic from his fourteenth studio album, Mandatory Fun (2014). The song is a parody of the 2013 single "Blurred Lines" by Robin Thicke, featuring Pharrell Williams and T.I. The song parodies the misuse of proper English grammar and usage. Yankovic chose a topic that would be distinct from those used in most previous parodies of the song.

"Word Crimes" received favorable reviews from contemporary music critics. The song's music video utilizes kinetic typography, and was compared to the earlier educational Schoolhouse Rock! musical cartoons.

== Composition ==
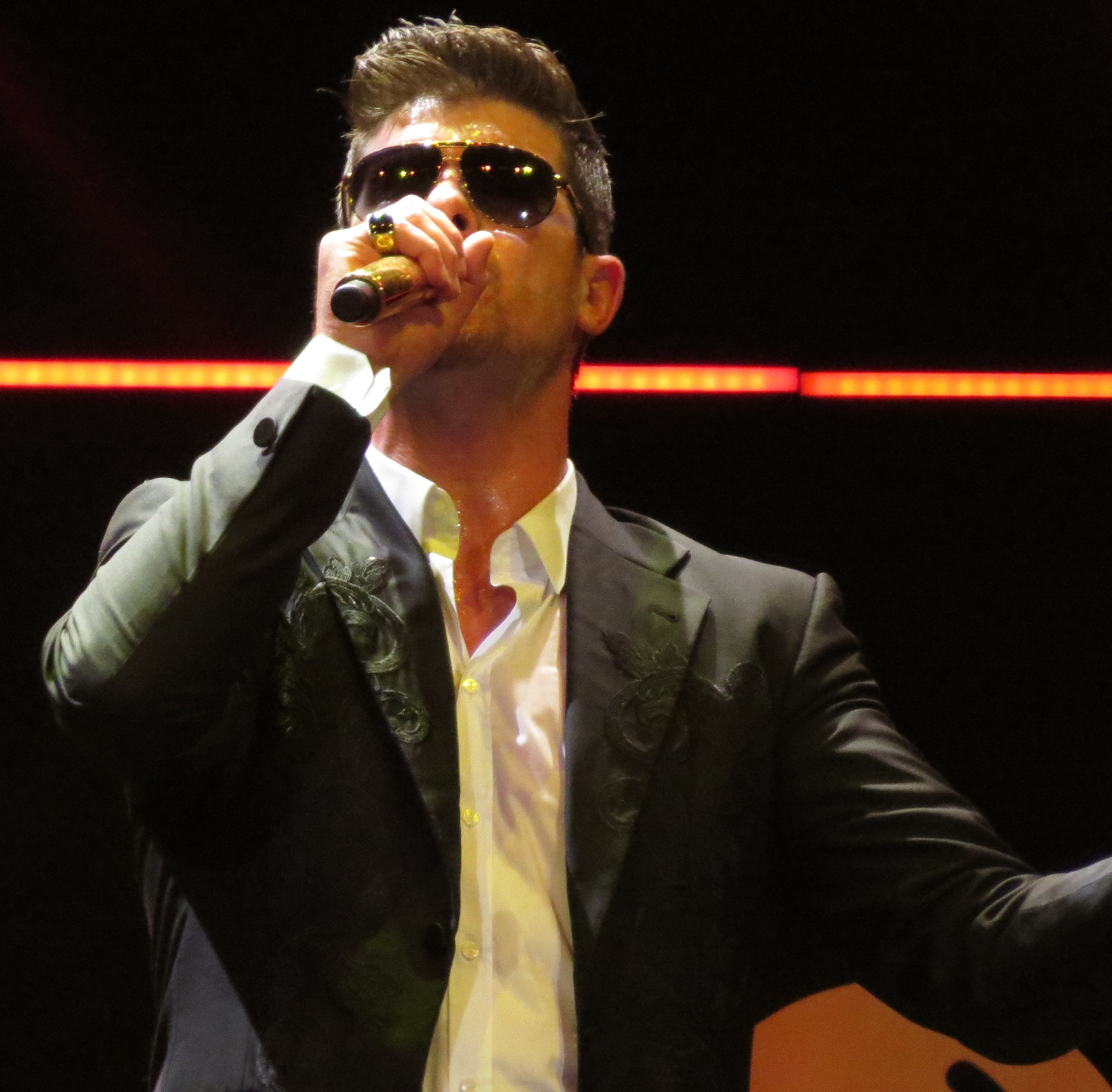
The song parodies "Blurred Lines" by Robin Thicke, pictured here in December 2013.

The subject matter in "Word Crimes" was an extension of Yankovic's policy of writing "left-of-center" parodies, especially considering the number of parodies that surface on YouTube. Yankovic had surveyed his online competition and was disappointed that many parodies revolved around rape (due to the original song's controversy and mixed critical reception). To differentiate his version, he opted to make the parody about grammar; "I don't think anybody, to this point, had done a 'Blurred Lines' parody about proper use of grammar," he told NPR. Yankovic has considered himself a "grammar nerd", having previously posted photos and video clips to social media sites pointing out grammatical errors in everyday signs, and considered "Word Crimes" his opportunity to put this into song form. He considered the song to be both humorously critical of those that have poor grammar, as well as those that are obsessive about grammar, and compared it to how his previous song "Don't Download This Song" was double-edged by poking fun at both those who illegally downloaded music and overprotective labels trying to prevent that.

"Word Crimes" mocks online commenters and their neglect of standard English grammar. In the song, Yankovic spoofs those who use numbers in place of letters, which he criticizes as only acceptable if they are 7-years-old, or Prince (referring to successful Prince songs with numbers in their title, such as "I Would Die 4 U"). He also lampoons people who use the word literally to describe non-literal situations. The song highlights other common prescriptions: Yankovic mentions the usage of less versus fewer, and the use of "to whom" as opposed to "to who". Spelling is also brought up, as he states that there is no "x" in the word espresso (n.b. expresso). Regarding punctuation, he comments on the use of "it's" as a possessive instead of the correct "its", and the optional use of the Oxford comma. Yankovic also mentions the common confusion between "doing good", "doing good deeds", and "doing well". Also mentioned in the song is the idiom "I couldn't care less" being commonly corrupted as "I could care less".

Yankovic noted that he deliberately added a split infinitive in the lyrics to see if listeners would notice. The line "Try your best to not drool" appears at the end of the song.

After "Word Crimes" was released, Thicke and Pharrell were sued by the estate of Marvin Gaye for plagiarizing too much of Gaye's music from "Got to Give It Up" within "Blurred Lines". The estate won their case, which besides monetary damages, required that Gaye be credited on "Blurred Lines". As a result, Yankovic also had to add Gaye's credit to "Word Crimes". However, according to Yankovic, he has not had to pay any additional royalties to Gaye's estate from this, believing that whatever he would have had to pay was already covered in the royalty split he had given to Thicke and Pharrell for his parody.

== Music video ==
The video incorporates a re-creation of the Merriam-Webster logo.

The song's music video, a lyric video, was released on the same day of the album's release, the second in a series of eight consecutive video releases. The video is a kinetic typography video created by Jarrett Heather, which plays on the song's theme of proper grammar, spelling, and punctuation. MTV News considered it a spoof on the increasing popularity of lyric videos, calling it "a pretty incredible piece of animation".

Heather had previously gained fame in producing a similar typography video for Jonathan Coulton's song "Shop Vac". The "Shop Vac" video, Heather's first major public production, had caught Yankovic's attention, and the musician sent Heather an email about creating a similar video for "Word Crimes" around November 2013. The video started production in January 2014 after Yankovic sent the final lyrics to Heather, and took about 500 hours of work in Heather's off-hours to assemble using the Adobe Systems suite of products. Heather and Yankovic coordinated nearly daily in the early stages of the video, with Heather presenting initial sketches and storyboards for the artist's approval. Initial designs of the video were based on the "Blurred Lines" video, using the color scheme and font style, and expanding it to a full color bible to provide contrast during the video. Most of the drawn animations in the video were created by Heather; the child's drawing at the lyric "unless you're seven" was done by Heather's son, Ethan. The video was completed by April 1.

The video spoofs a number of facets of the original "Blurred Lines" video, such as the large hashtags in the original that appear seemingly at random, dancing letters and punctuation symbols on an off-white background, and ends with the phrase "'Weird Al' Yankovic has a big dictionary" spelled in balloon letters.

The video also is filled with Easter eggs that appear quickly onscreen during lyrics. The graphic for the title phrase is modeled after the Merriam-Webster dictionary logo. During the line "You're a lost cause," a poster for ABC's Lost appears, with the sentence "Learn your ABC's, doofus" using the ABC logo. The number 27, which frequently appears in previous works by Yankovic, appears throughout the video. An illustration on a college notebook cover includes Pac-Man and the character Trogdor the Burninator from the Homestar Runner animated web series. The graphic for the lyric "irony is not coincidence" pokes fun at Alanis Morissette's use of the word "ironic", noting that "rain on [one's] wedding day" is merely coincidence, whereas a better example of irony would be a fire truck being destroyed by fire. The video also includes cameos by Doge and the Microsoft Office Assistant "Clippit" (also known as "Clippy"), and references to the Sacramento-based offices of the California Department of Food and Agriculture where Heather is employed.

== Reception ==
Critically, The A.V. Club called the song "a modern-day 'Conjunction Junction'", writing: "The song combines cheeky grammar lessons with a lamentation for society's diminished writing skills." CNN made a similar comparison, believing the song "could follow in the grand tradition of Schoolhouse Rock!". Rolling Stone wrote that "The schoolhouse R&B of 'Word Crimes' is clever enough to win over the harshest critics of Robin Thicke's 'Blurred Lines.'" ABC News characterized the parody as "spot-on". Billboard called the song the album's best, writing that "[a] more satirical, cynical parodist could have taken this in a million super-searing directions, but Al isn't interested in commenting on Thicke's alleged misogyny."

The work has received some negative attention from linguists and educators, who view the prescriptivism celebrated in the song as scientifically ill-informed, arbitrary, and encouraging of unnecessary and damaging social distinctions. Mignon Fogarty of the podcast Grammar Girl's Quick and Dirty Tips for Better Writing considered that the video, which has a high likelihood of being used in educational settings, speaks down to those with poor grammar, criticizing "the call to feel superior and to put other people down for writing errors". Shortly after the song was released, Yankovic stated that he had been unaware that the word spastic used in the song is "considered a highly offensive slur by some people", particularly in the United Kingdom, and apologized for its presence in his lyrics.

== Commercial performance ==
"Word Crimes" debuted at number 39 on the Billboard Hot 100 for the week ending August 2, 2014, making it Yankovic's fourth Top 40 hit (following "Eat It" in 1984, "Smells Like Nirvana" in 1992, and "White & Nerdy" in 2006, which peaked at numbers 12, 35, and 9, respectively). It made him only the third artist in popular music history to have at least one Top 40 single in every decade since the 1980s, alongside previous parody targets Madonna and Michael Jackson. Also that same week, the track debuted on the top on the Comedy Digital Songs chart.

== Weekly chart positions ==
Chart (2014)	Peak position
US Billboard Hot 100	39
US Comedy Digital Tracks (Billboard)	1

== Notes ==
1. Gaye was not credited as a songwriter, but a court later ruled that "Blurred Lines" plagiarized Gaye's song "Got to Give It Up", and thus must be credited on "Blurred Lines" and all derivative works, including "Word Crimes".
