= Robert Palmer discography =

Discography of English musician Robert Palmer

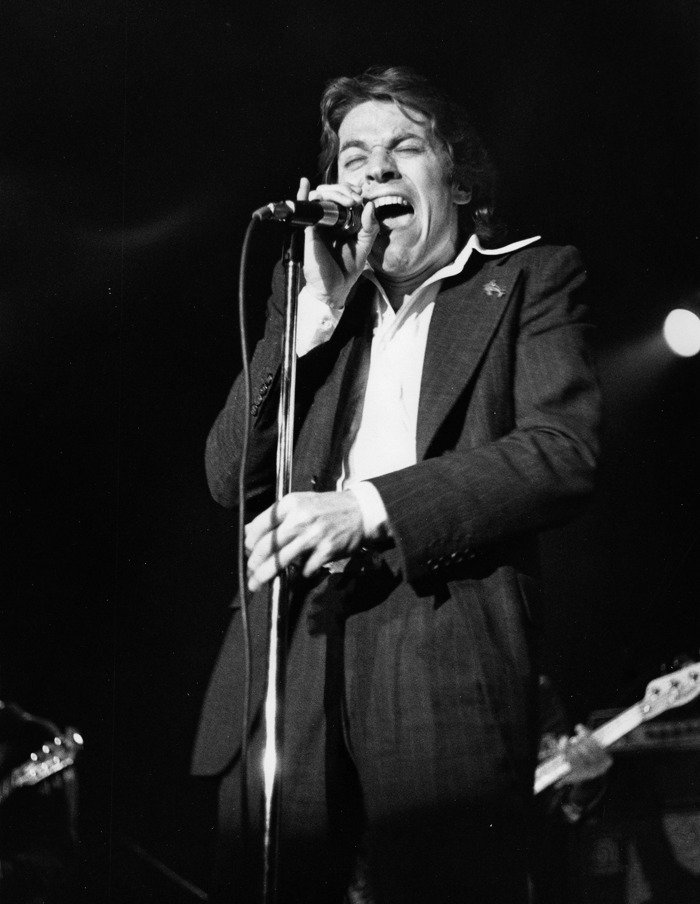
- Palmer performing in 1976
- Studio albums: 14
- Live albums: 3
- Compilation albums: 12
- Singles: 50
- Box sets: 3

The discography of English singer Robert Palmer consists of 14 studio albums, three live albums and 12 compilation albums. For the discographies of The Alan Bown Set, Vinegar Joe and the Power Station (groups Palmer was a member of), see their respective pages.

== Albums ==
=== Studio albums ===
Title	Album details	Peak chart positions									Certifications
Title	Album details	UK	AUS	AUT	CAN	GER	NL	NZ	SWE	US	Certifications
Sneakin' Sally Through the Alley	Released: September 1974; Label: Island; Formats: LP, MC, 8-track	—	—	—	—	—	—	—	—	107	
Pressure Drop	Released: November 1975; Label: Island; Formats: LP, MC, 8-track	—	—	—	89	—	—	—	—	136	
Some People Can Do What They Like	Released: October 1976; Label: Island; Formats: LP, MC, 8-track	46	80	—	—	—	—	—	—	68	
Double Fun	Released: 17 March 1978; Label: Island; Formats: LP, MC, 8-track	—	75	—	57	—	10	29	—	45	
Secrets	Released: 15 June 1979; Label: Island; Formats: LP, MC, 8-track	54	23	—	4	—	42	39	—	19	CAN: Platinum
Clues	Released: August 1980; Label: Island; Formats: LP, MC	31	26	—	9	6	16	21	1	59	CAN: Gold; GER: Gold
Pride	Released: April 1983; Label: Island; Formats: LP, MC	37	89	—	94	35	22	27	36	112	
Riptide	Released: 4 November 1985; Label: Island; Formats: CD, LP, MC	5	17	—	2	—	72	13	—	8	UK: Gold; CAN: 3× Platinum; US: 2× Platinum
Heavy Nova	Released: 27 June 1988; Label: EMI; Formats: CD, LP, MC	17	2	—	5	50	42	14	47	13	UK: Gold; AUS: 2× Platinum; CAN: Platinum; US: Platinum
Don't Explain	Released: 5 November 1990; Label: EMI; Formats: CD, 2xLP, MC	9	29	17	28	40	85	48	48	88	UK: Gold; AUS: Gold
Ridin' High	Released: 19 October 1992; Label: EMI; Formats: CD, LP, MC	32	175	—	—	—	—	—	—	173	
Honey	Released: 12 September 1994; Label: EMI; Formats: CD, MC	25	155	—	—	76	85	—	—	—	
Rhythm & Blues	Released: 28 October 1998; Label: Eagle, Pyramid; Formats: CD	118	—	—	—	—	—	—	—	—	
Drive	Released: 12 May 2003; Label: Universal Music TV, Compendia; Formats: CD	—	—	—	—	—	—	—	—	—	
"—" denotes releases that did not chart or were not released in that territory.

=== Live albums ===
Title	Album details	Peak chart positions				
Title	Album details	UK	CAN	NL	SWE	US
Maybe It's Live	Released: March 1982; Label: Island; Formats: LP, MC	32	48	23	39	148
Live at the Apollo	Released: May 2001; Label: Eagle; Formats: CD, MC	—	—	—	—	—
At the BBC	Released: 18 May 2010; Label: Spectrum Music/Universal; Formats: CD	—	—	—	—	—
"—" denotes releases that did not chart or were not released in that territory.

=== Compilation albums ===
Title	Album details	Peak chart positions							Certifications
Title	Album details	UK	AUS	CAN	GER	NL	NZ	US	Certifications
Addictions: Volume 1	Released: 30 October 1989; Label: Island; Formats: CD, LP, MC	7	10	60	32	—	3	79	UK: Platinum; AUS: Platinum; CAN: Platinum; US: Platinum
Addictions: Volume 2	Released: 23 March 1992; Label: Island; Formats: CD, LP, MC	12	167	—	—	—	—	—	UK: Silver
The Very Best of Robert Palmer	Released: 16 October 1995; Label: EMI; Formats: CD, MC	4	123	—	73	86	—	—	UK: Platinum
Woke Up Laughing	Released: 6 October 1998; Label: Metro Blue; Formats: CD; Collection of remixes and alternative versions	—	—	—	—	—	—	—	
20th Century Masters – The Millennium Collection: The Best of Robert Palmer	Released: 26 October 1999; Label: Island; Formats: CD, MC	—	—	—	—	—	—	—	
The Essential Selection	Released: 4 September 2000; Label: EMI; Formats: CD	—	—	—	—	—	—	—	
Best of Both Worlds: The Robert Palmer Anthology (1974–2001)	Released: 30 April 2002; Label: Hip-O; Formats: 2xCD	—	—	—	—	—	—	—	
At His Very Best	Released: 4 November 2002; Label: Universal Music TV; Formats: CD, MC	38	—	—	—	—	—	—	NZ: Gold
The Very Best of the Island Years	Released: 19 July 2005; Label: Island Def Jam Music Group; Formats: CD	—	—	—	—	—	—	—	
The Silver Collection	Released: 4 June 2007; Label: Spectrum; Formats: CD	—	—	—	—	—	—	—	
Essential	Released: 2 May 2014; Label: Universal Music; Formats: CD	—	—	—	—	—	—	—	
Collected	Released: 19 August 2016; Label: Universal Music; Formats: 3xCD, 2xLP	—	—	—	—	63	—	—	
"—" denotes releases that did not chart or were not released in that territory.

=== Box sets ===
Title	Album details
The Island Years 1974–1985	Released: 5 September 2007; Label: Island; Formats: 9xCD; Japan-only release
Original Album Series	Released: 11 September 2015; Label: Parlophone/Warner Music; Formats: 5xCD
5 Classic Albums	Released: 15 April 2016; Label: Spectrum/Universal; Formats: 5xCD

== Singles ==
Single	Year	Peak chart positions										Album
Single	Year	UK	AUS	BEL (FL)	CAN	GER	IRE	NL	NZ	US	US Main	Album
"Sneakin' Sally Through the Alley" (Note: "Sneakin' Sally Through the Alley" was only released as a single in the US, Australasia, and the Netherlands.)	1974	—	—	—	—	—	—	—	—	— (Note: "Sneakin' Sally Through the Alley" did not enter the Billboard Hot 100, but did peak at number 96 on Cash Box.)	—	Sneakin' Sally Through the Alley
"Which of Us Is the Fool"	1975	—	—	—	—	—	—	—	—	— (Note: "Get Outside" did not enter the Billboard Hot 100, but peaked at number five on the Bubbling Under Hot 100 chart.)	—	Pressure Drop
"Give Me an Inch"	1976	—	—	—	—	—	—	—	—	— (Note: "Give Me an Inch" did not enter the Billboard Hot 100, but peaked at number six on the Bubbling Under Hot 100 chart under the title "Give Me an Inch Girl".)	—	Pressure Drop
"Man Smart (Woman Smarter)"	1976	—	90	—	—	—	—	—	—	63	—	Some People Can Do What They Like
"One Last Look" (Note: "One Last Look" was only released as a single in the US.)	1977	—	—	—	—	—	—	—	—	—	—	Some People Can Do What They Like
"Every Kinda People"	1978	53	82	—	12	—	—	—	35	16	—	Double Fun
"You Overwhelm Me" (Note: "You Overwhelm Me" was only released as a single in the US and Canada.)	1978	—	—	—	—	—	—	—	—	—	—	Double Fun
"Best of Both Worlds"	1978	— (Note: This single did not enter the UK Singles Chart, but did reach number 92 on the Record Business Singles Chart.)	—	4	—	36	—	10	—	—	—	Double Fun
"You're Gonna Get What's Coming" (Note: "You're Gonna Get What's Coming" was only released as a single in the US and Canada.)	1978	—	—	—	—	—	—	—	—	—	—	Double Fun
"Bad Case of Loving You (Doctor, Doctor)"	1979	61	13	19	1	—	—	31	20	14	—	Secrets
"Jealous"	1979	—	—	—	31	—	—	—	—	— (Note: "Jealous" did not enter the Billboard Hot 100, but peaked at number six on the Bubbling Under Hot 100 chart.)	—	Secrets
"Can We Still Be Friends"	1979	—	—	—	—	—	—	—	—	52	—	Secrets
"What's It Take" (Note: "What's It Take" was only released as a single in Continental Europe.)	1979	—	—	21	—	19	—	—	—	—	—	Secrets
"Johnny and Mary"	1980	44	20	8	32	7	—	27	12	—	—	Clues
"Looking for Clues"	1980	33	23	9	7	3	—	17	—	— (Note: "Looking for Clues" did not enter the Billboard Hot 100, but peaked at number five on the Bubbling Under Hot 100 chart.)	—	Clues
"Not a Second Time"	1981	— (Note: This single did not enter the UK Singles Chart, but did reach number 79 on the Record Business Singles Top 100 chart.)	—	—	—	—	—	—	—	—	—	Clues
"Some Guys Have All the Luck"	1982	16	41	—	—	52	—	—	49	—	59	Maybe It's Live
"Pride"	1982	—	—	—	—	—	—	—	—	—	—	Pride
"You Are in My System"	1983	53	83	—	—	52	—	—	27	78	33	Pride
"You Can Have It (Take My Heart)"	1983	66	—	25	—	—	—	28	—	—	—	Pride
"All Around the World" (Note: "All Around the World" was only released as a single in the US and Canada.)	1985	—	—	—	—	—	—	—	—	—	—	Explorers: Music from the Motion Picture Soundtrack
"Discipline of Love"	1985	95	—	38	—	—	—	—	—	82	—	Riptide
"Riptide"	1986	85	—	—	—	—	—	—	—	—	—	Riptide
"Addicted to Love"	1986	5	1	34	4	—	4	34	2	1	1	Riptide
"Hyperactive" (Note: "Hyperactive" was only released as a single in Continental Europe, North America, and Australasia.)	1986	—	72	—	—	—	—	—	—	33	21	Riptide
"I Didn't Mean to Turn You On"	1986	9	26	—	13	—	8	—	23	2	41	Riptide
"Discipline of Love" (re-issue)	1986	68	—	—	—	—	—	—	—	—	—	Riptide
"Sweet Lies"	1988	58	—	—	—	—	—	—	—	94	—	Sweet Lies: Original Motion Picture Soundtrack
"Simply Irresistible"	1988	44	1	—	2	57	—	—	6	2	1	Heavy Nova
"She Makes My Day"	1988	6	9	—	80	—	6	57	47	—	—	Heavy Nova
"Early in the Morning" (Note: "Early in the Morning" was only released as a single in the US and Australia.)	1988	—	26	—	26	—	—	—	—	19	40	Heavy Nova
"Tell Me I'm Not Dreaming" (Note: "Tell Me I'm Not Dreaming" was only released as a single in the US and Australia.)	1989	—	117	—	—	—	—	—	—	60	—	Heavy Nova
"Change His Ways"	1989	28	38	39	—	62	21	47	29	—	—	Heavy Nova
"It Could Happen to You"	1989	71	—	—	—	—	—	—	—	—	—	Heavy Nova
"Bad Case of Loving You (Doctor, Doctor)" (remix)	1989	80	106	—	—	—	—	—	—	—	—	Addictions: Volume 1
"Life in Detail" (Note: "Life in Detail" was only released as a promotional single in the US and Canada.)	1990	—	—	—	34	—	—	—	—	—	7	Pretty Woman: Original Motion Picture Soundtrack
"I'll Be Your Baby Tonight" (with UB40)	1990	6	4	12	58	14	6	4	1	—	—	Don't Explain
"You're Amazing" (Note: "You're Amazing" was only released as a single in the US, Canada, and Australasia.)	1990	—	103	—	14	—	—	—	—	28	5	Don't Explain
"Mercy Mercy Me" / "I Want You" (medley)	1990	9	89	21	6	33	8	27	33	16	—	Don't Explain
"Happiness"	1991	80	—	—	—	62	—	—	—	—	—	Don't Explain
"Dreams to Remember"	1991	68	182	—	—	—	—	—	—	—	—	Don't Explain
"Every Kinda People" (remix)	1992	43	157	—	26	—	—	—	—	—	—	Addictions: Volume 2
"You're in My System" (remix)	1992	88	—	—	—	—	—	—	—	—	—	Addictions: Volume 2
"Witchcraft"	1992	50	—	—	—	—	—	—	—	—	—	Ridin' High
"Girl U Want"	1994	57	118	—	—	—	—	—	—	—	—	Honey
"Know by Now"	1994	25	193	38	23	51	—	—	—	—	—	Honey
"You Blow Me Away"	1994	38	—	—	—	—	—	—	—	—	—	Honey
"Respect Yourself"	1995	45	170	—	—	—	—	—	—	—	—	The Very Best of Robert Palmer
"True Love"	1999	87	—	—	—	—	—	—	—	—	—	Rhythm & Blues
"Addicted to Love" (vs Shake B4 Use)	2003	42	—	—	—	—	—	—	—	—	—	Non-album single
"—" denotes releases that did not chart or were not released in that country.
