= 20th Century Masters – The Millennium Collection: The Best of Robert Palmer =

Compilation album by Robert Palmer
- Released: 26 October 1999
- Recorded: 1974–1985
- Genres: Rock; pop rock
- Length: 38:53
- Labels: Island; Universal
- Producer: Bill Levenson

Robert Palmer chronology
Rhythm & Blues (1998)	20th Century Masters – The Millennium Collection: The Best of Robert Palmer (1999)	Live at the Apollo (2001)

Professional ratings
Review scores
Source	Rating
AllMusic	3/5 stars

20th Century Masters – The Millennium Collection: The Best of Robert Palmer is a compilation album by English singer Robert Palmer released through Universal Music Group. The collection spans his history from 1974 to 1985.

== Track listing ==
No.	Title	Writer(s)	Original release	Length
1.	"Sneakin' Sally Through the Alley"	Allen Toussaint	Sneakin' Sally Through the Alley, 1974	4:24
2.	"Man Smart (Woman Smarter)"	King Radio	Some People Can Do What They Like, 1976	2:35
3.	"Every Kinda People"	Andy Fraser	Double Fun, 1978	3:16
4.	"Best of Both Worlds"	Robert Palmer	Double Fun	3:56
5.	"Bad Case of Loving You (Doctor, Doctor)"	John Moon Martin	Secrets, 1979	3:13
6.	"Can We Still Be Friends"	Todd Rundgren	Secrets, 1979	3:39
7.	"Looking for Clues"	Palmer	Clues, 1980	4:54
8.	"Some Guys Have All the Luck"	Jeff Fortgang	Maybe It's Live, 1982	3:09
9.	"Addicted to Love"	Palmer	Riptide, 1985	6:03
10.	"I Didn't Mean to Turn You On"	James Harris III; Terry Lewis	Riptide	3:44
Total length:				38:53
