= The Very Best of Robert Palmer =

Greatest hits album by Robert Palmer
- Released: 16 October 1995
- Recorded: 1978–1995; 1997
- Genres: Rock; pop
- Length: 68:20; 73:40 (reissue)
- Label: Capitol

Robert Palmer chronology
Honey (1994)	The Very Best of Robert Palmer (1995)	Woke Up Laughing (1998)

Singles from The Very Best of Robert Palmer
- 1. "Respect Yourself" Released: 2 October 1995

Professional ratings
Review scores
Source	Rating
AllMusic	3/5 stars

The Very Best of Robert Palmer is a compilation album by English singer-songwriter Robert Palmer, released by Capitol Records on 16 October 1995. It features a collection of his singles from 1978 to 1994, plus the new single "Respect Yourself". The album was reissued in 1997 with a re-recording of Palmer's 1985 hit single "Addicted to Love".

== Track listing ==
1995 version
No.	Title	Writer(s)	Original release	Length
1.	"Addicted to Love"	Robert Palmer	Riptide, 1985	4:25
2.	"Bad Case of Loving You (Doctor, Doctor)"	John Moon Martin	Secrets, 1979	3:10
3.	"Simply Irresistible"	Palmer	Heavy Nova, 1988	4:12
4.	"Get It On" (as part of The Power Station)	Marc Bolan	The Power Station, 1985	5:29
5.	"Some Guys Have All the Luck"	Jeff Fortgang	Maybe It's Live, 1982	3:08
6.	"I Didn't Mean to Turn You On"	James Harris III; Terry Lewis	Riptide	3:36
7.	"Looking for Clues"	Palmer	Clues, 1980	4:58
8.	"You Are in My System"	David Frank; Mic Murphy	Pride, 1983	4:58
9.	"Some Like It Hot" (as part of The Power Station)	Palmer; Andy Taylor; John Taylor	The Power Station	5:05
10.	"Respect Yourself"	Luther Ingram; Mack Rice	New recording	4:05
11.	"I'll Be Your Baby Tonight" (with UB40)	Bob Dylan	Don't Explain, 1990	3:23
12.	"Johnny and Mary"	Palmer	Clues	3:59
13.	"She Makes My Day"	Palmer	Heavy Nova	4:21
14.	"Know by Now"	Palmer	Honey, 1994	4:09
15.	"Every Kinda People"	Andy Fraser	Double Fun, 1978	3:20
16.	"Mercy Mercy Me / I Want You"	Marvin Gaye: Arthur "T-Boy" Ross; Leon Ware	Don't Explain	5:51
Total length:				68:20

1997 reissue
No.	Title	Writer(s)	Original release	Length
1.	"Addicted to Love '97"	Palmer	New recording	5:19
2.	"Bad Case of Loving You (Doctor, Doctor)"	Martin	Secrets	3:10
3.	"Simply Irresistible"	Palmer	Heavy Nova	4:12
4.	"Get It On" (as part of The Power Station)	Bolan	The Power Station	5:29
5.	"Some Guys Have All the Luck"	Fortgang	Maybe It's Live	3:08
6.	"I Didn't Mean to Turn You On"	Harris; Lewis	Riptide	3:36
7.	"Looking for Clues"	Palmer	Clues	4:58
8.	"You Are in My System"	Frank; Murphy	Pride	4:58
9.	"Some Like It Hot" (as part of The Power Station)	Palmer; A. Taylor; J. Taylor	The Power Station	5:05
10.	"Respect Yourself"	Ingram; Rice	New recording	4:05
11.	"I'll Be Your Baby Tonight" (with UB40)	Dylan	Don't Explain	3:23
12.	"Johnny and Mary"	Palmer	Clues	3:59
13.	"She Makes My Day"	Palmer	Heavy Nova	4:21
14.	"Know by Now"	Palmer	Honey	4:09
15.	"Every Kinda People"	Fraser	Double Fun	3:20
16.	"Mercy Mercy Me / I Want You"	Gaye: Ross; Ware	Don't Explain	5:51
17.	"Addicted to Love" (original version)	Palmer	Riptide	4:26
Total length:				73:40

== Charts ==
=== Weekly charts ===
Chart (1995)	Peak position
Dutch Albums (Album Top 100)	86
German Albums (Offizielle Top 100)	73
Scottish Albums (Official Charts)	10
UK Albums (Official Charts)	4

=== Year-end charts ===
Chart (1995)	Position
UK Albums (OCC)	40

== Certifications ==
Region	Certification	Certified units/sales
United Kingdom (BPI)	Platinum	300,000^{^}
^{^} Shipments figures based on certification alone.
