= Addictions: Volume 1 =

Greatest hits album by Robert Palmer
- Released: 30 October 1989
- Recorded: 1978–1988
- Genres: Rock; pop rock
- Length: 51:30
- Label: Island

Robert Palmer chronology
Heavy Nova (1988)	Addictions: Volume 1 (1989)	Don't Explain (1990)

Professional ratings
Review scores
Source	Rating
AllMusic	4.5/5 stars
New Musical Express	7/10
Record Mirror	4/5 stars
The Rolling Stone Album Guide	3.5/5 stars

Addictions: Volume 1 is the first compilation album by English singer Robert Palmer, released in 1989 by Island Records. It contains singles and album tracks, some in remix form, from Palmer's solo studio albums Double Fun (1978), Secrets (1979), Clues (1980), Pride (1983), Riptide (1985) and Heavy Nova (1988), plus two tracks from the live album Maybe It's Live, two tracks from the soundtrack to the film Sweet Lies, and one track from the Power Station's self-titled album (1985), on which Palmer is lead vocalist.

== Track listing ==
All tracks are written by Robert Palmer, except where noted.

No.	Title	Writer(s)	Original release	Length
1.	"Bad Case of Loving You (Doctor, Doctor)" (remix)	John Moon Martin	Secrets, 1979	3:15
2.	"Pride"		Pride, 1983	4:05
3.	"Addicted to Love" (edit)		Riptide, 1985	4:21
4.	"Sweet Lies"	Palmer; Frank Blair; Dony Wynn	Sweet Lies soundtrack, 1988	3:05
5.	"Woke Up Laughing" (remix)		Clues, 1980	4:06
6.	"Looking for Clues" (remix)		Clues	4:54
7.	"Some Guys Have All the Luck"	Jeff Fortgang	Maybe It's Live, 1982	3:06
8.	"Some Like It Hot" (as part of The Power Station)	Palmer; Andy Taylor; John Taylor	The Power Station, 1985	5:05
9.	"What's It Take?"		Secrets	3:28
10.	"Every Kinda People" (remix)	Andy Fraser	Double Fun, 1978	3:26
11.	"Johnny and Mary"		Clues	4:05
12.	"Simply Irresistible"		Heavy Nova, 1988	4:18
13.	"Style Kills"	Palmer; Gary Numan	Maybe It's Live	4:16
Total length:				51:30

== Charts ==
Chart (1989–1990)	Peak position
Australian Albums (ARIA)	10
Canada Top Albums/CDs (RPM)	60
German Albums (Offizielle Top 100)	32
New Zealand Albums (RMNZ)	3
UK Albums (Official Charts)	7
US Billboard 200	79

== Certifications ==
Region	Certification	Certified units/sales
Australia (ARIA)	Platinum	70,000^{^}
Canada (Music Canada)	Gold	50,000^{^}
United Kingdom (BPI)	Platinum	300,000^{^}
United States (RIAA)	Platinum	1,000,000^{^}
^{^} Shipments figures based on certification alone.
