= Addictions: Volume 2 =

Greatest hits album by Robert Palmer
- Released: 23 March 1992
- Recorded: 1974–1988
- Genres: Pop; rock
- Length: 57:36
- Label: Island
- Producers: Robert Palmer; Steve Smith; Bernard Edwards; Tom Moulton

Robert Palmer chronology
Don't Explain (1990)	Addictions: Volume 2 (1992)	Ridin' High (1992)

Addictions: Volume 2 is the second compilation album by English singer-songwriter Robert Palmer, released by Island Records in 1992. The album features remixes of songs and singles Palmer recorded from 1974 to 1988.

== Critical reception ==
Professional ratings
Review scores
Source	Rating
AllMusic	3/5 stars
NME	5/10

Upon its release, David Quantick of NME felt the compilation would not repeat the success of its 1989 predecessor Addictions: Volume 1 as although "it too demonstrates Palmer's eclecticism, [it] is less interesting". He described it as a "slightly inessential album" with only "two top songs": the "charming smoky ballad" "She Makes My Day" and "I Dream of Wires", the latter of which Quantick considered "so odd that it makes 'Low' sound like Sonia". Stephen Thomas Erlewine was noted that "all [the] tracks are quite good" and the album overall "sound[s] great", but was disapproving of the fact that many of the tracks presented "ha[ve] been remixed, remade, or [feature] new vocal tracks", resulting in it failing to be an "accurate retrospective".

== Track listing ==
All tracks are written by Robert Palmer, except where noted.

No.	Title	Writer(s)	Original release	Length
1.	"Remember to Remember" (remake)		Secrets, 1979	4:13
2.	"Sneakin' Sally Thru the Alley" (remix)	Allen Toussaint	Sneakin' Sally Through the Alley, 1974	4:44
3.	"Maybe It's You" (remix)	David Ian Ainsworth; Danny Wilde	Maybe It's Live, 1982	4:05
4.	"You Are in My System" (revoiced)	David Frank; Mic Murphy	Pride, 1983	5:00
5.	"I Didn't Mean to Turn You On" (early fade)	James Harris III; Terry Lewis	Riptide, 1985	3:37
6.	"Can We Still Be Friends" (remix)	Todd Rundgren	Secrets	3:40
7.	"Man Smart, Woman Smarter" (remix)	King Radio	Some People Can Do What They Like, 1976	3:02
8.	"Too Good to Be True" (remix)		Secrets	2:57
9.	"Every Kinda People" (remix)		Double Fun, 1978	3:48
10.	"She Makes My Day"		Heavy Nova, 1988	4:22
11.	"Best of Both Worlds" (remix)		Double Fun	4:11
12.	"Give Me an Inch" (remix)		Pressure Drop, 1975	3:02
13.	"You're Gonna Get What's Coming" (remix)		Double Fun	3:58
14.	"I Dream of Wires"	Gary Numan	Clues, 1980	4:34
15.	"The Silver Gun" (early fade)	Palmer; Alan Powell	Pride	5:02
Total length:				57:36

== Charts ==
Chart (1992)	Peak position
Australian Albums (ARIA)	188
UK Albums (Official Charts)	12
