= Woke Up Laughing =

Remix album by Robert Palmer
- Released: 6 October 1998
- Recorded: 1977–1997
- Genres: Rock; pop rock; jazz
- Length: 58:05
- Label: Metro Blue
- Producer: Robert Palmer

Robert Palmer chronology
The Very Best of Robert Palmer (1995)	Woke Up Laughing (1998)	Rhythm & Blues (1998)

Woke Up Laughing is a compilation album by English singer-songwriter Robert Palmer, released on 6 October 1998 by Metro Blue, a sister label of Blue Note Records. It consists of remixes, re-recordings, and otherwise creative approaches to Palmer's discography that is "inspired by a love of the world of music, 1977–1997, with many alternate versions appearing for the first time on disc," according to the CD's back cover. Gerald Seligman, the founder of EMI Hemisphere, suggested the initial idea for Woke Up Laughing, but Palmer wasn't interested in a simple compilation, preferring instead a rethink and a fresh approach. The cover photo was taken by Palmer's longtime drummer, Dony Wynn; when Palmer's son, Jim, saw it, he thought it was perfect for the album and recommended it be used.

== Track listing ==
All tracks are written by Robert Palmer, except where noted.

No.	Title	Writer(s)	Original release	Length
1.	"Housework"	Palmer; Stephen Fellows	Don't Expain, 1990	3:11
2.	"Charanga" (as part of The Power Station)	Palmer; Andy Taylor; John Taylor; Tony Thompson	"She Can Rock It" single, 1996	6:55
3.	"Woke Up Laughing 79/89"		Clues, 1980	5:31
4.	"Aeroplane"		Don't Explain	3:01
5.	"History"		Don't Explain	4:29
6.	"What's It Take?"		Secrets, 1979	3:23
7.	"Pride"		Pride, 1983	3:50
8.	"Chance"	Palmer; Alan Mansfield; Saverio Porciello	Ridin' High, 1992	2:33
9.	"Honeymoon"		Honey, 1994	2:17
10.	"Best of Both Worlds"		Double Fun, 1978	4:09
11.	"Monogamy"	Palmer; Francis Bebey	Sweet Lies soundtrack, 1988	4:12
12.	"Honey Bee"		Honey	5:18
13.	"Casting a Spell"		Heavy Nova, 1988	3:48
14.	"Between Us"		Heavy Nova	4:53
Total length:				58:05
