= Life in Detail =

Single by Robert Palmer

from the album Pretty Woman (soundtrack)
- Released: 1990
- Length: 4:07
- Label: EMI
- Songwriters: Robert Palmer, Allen Powell
- Producer: Robert Palmer

Robert Palmer singles chronology
"Bad Case of Loving You (Doctor, Doctor)" (remix) (1989)	"Life in Detail" (1990)	"I'll Be Your Baby Tonight" (1990)

"Life in Detail" is a song by the English vocalist Robert Palmer, which was released in 1990 as a promotional single from the soundtrack of the American romantic comedy film Pretty Woman. The song was written by Palmer and Allen Powell, and produced by Palmer. It reached No. 7 on the US Billboard Album Rock Tracks, and No. 34 on the Canadian RPM Top Singles Chart.

"Life in Detail" had been written exclusively for the film. Powell had previously been the drummer in Vinegar Joe, which Palmer fronted, in the early 1970s. Following the band's split, Palmer and Powell continued their friendship and would write a number of songs together which Palmer recorded. According to Manchester Evening News, "Life in Detail" allowed him to buy a 40-foot sail boat to live on, which he had moored at Sausalito, California.

== Critical reception ==
Upon release, the Nanaimo Daily News described the song as a "thumping jumper". The Clarion-Ledger noted: "The driving "Life in Detail" is only slightly less irresistible than Palmer's previous chartbusters". Paul Sinclair of Super Deluxe Edition described the song as a "relative obscurity from the soundtrack of the film Pretty Woman".

== Track listing ==
CD single (promo only)

1. "Life in Detail" – 4:07

== Chart performance ==
Chart (1990)	Peak position
Canadian Top Singles (RPM)	34
US Billboard Modern Rock Tracks	14
US Billboard Album Rock Tracks	7

== Personnel ==
- Robert Palmer – vocals, producer
- Humberto Gatica – mixing
