= Sweet Lies =

Sweet Lies may refer to:

- Sweet Lies (film), a 1988 American film directed by Nathalie Delon
  - "Sweet Lies" (Robert Palmer song), the title track from the film
- "Sweet Lies" (Ellie Campbell song), 1999
- "Sweet Lies" (Wilkinson song), 2016
- "Sweet Lies", a song by Exo from The War: The Power of Music, 2017

== See also ==
- Sweet Lie, a 2021 Indian web series starring Devoleena Bhattacharjee
