= Live at the Apollo (Robert Palmer album) =

Live album by Robert Palmer
- Released: May 2001
- Recorded: 15 December 1988
- Venues: Apollo Theater, Harlem, New York
- Genre: Rock
- Length: 62:02
- Label: Eagle
- Producer: Robert Palmer

Robert Palmer chronology
| 20th Century Masters – The Millennium Collection: The Best of Robert Palmer (1999) | Live at the Apollo (2001) | Drive (2003) |

Professional ratings
Review scores
| Source | Rating |
|---|---|
| AllMusic | 3/5 stars |

Live at the Apollo is a live album by English singer-songwriter Robert Palmer, released by Eagle Records in May 2001. The performance was recorded at the Apollo Theater in Harlem, New York, at the final date, 15 December 1988, of the tour promoting the Heavy Nova album.

== Track listing ==
All tracks are written by Robert Palmer, except where noted.

| No. | Title | Writer(s) | Length |
|---|---|---|---|
| 1. | "Some Like It Hot" | Palmer; Andy Taylor; John Taylor | 5:18 |
| 2. | "Hyperactive" | Palmer; Dennis Nelson; Tony Haynes | 3:13 |
| 3. | "Discipline of Love" | David Batteau; Don Freeman | 3:01 |
| 4. | "Tell Me I'm Not Dreaming" | Michael Omartian; Bruce Sudano; Jay Gruska | 3:32 |
| 5. | "I Didn't Mean to Turn You On" | James Harris III; Terry Lewis | 3:34 |
| 6. | "Looking for Clues" | | 3:40 |
| 7. | "Change His Ways" | | 2:59 |
| 8. | "Pride" | | 3:03 |
| 9. | "Woke Up Laughing" | | 5:06 |
| 10. | "Johnny and Mary" | | 3:15 |
| 11. | "Riptide" | Gus Kahn; Walter Donaldson | 2:13 |
| 12. | "Between Us" | | 3:21 |
| 13. | "Flesh Wound" | Palmer; Frank Blair | 2:39 |
| 14. | "More Than Ever" | | 3:01 |
| 15. | "Simply Irresistible" | | 4:20 |
| 16. | "Casting a Spell" | | 3:20 |
| 17. | "Addicted to Love" | | 6:27 |
| Total length: | | | 62:02 |

== Personnel ==
- Robert Palmer – vocals
- Eddie Martinez – guitar
- Frank Blair – bass
- Dony Wynn – drums
- Brie Howard – percussion
- Alan Mansfield – keyboards
- David Rosenthal – keyboards
- BJ Nelson – vocals

The album is dedicated to: David "Cowboy" Conyers
