= Sweet Lies (Robert Palmer song) =

Single by Robert Palmer

from the album Addictions: Volume 1
- B-side: "Want You More"
- Released: 7 March 1988
- Length: 3:09
- Label: Island
- Songwriters: Robert Palmer; Frank Blair; Dony Wynn
- Producer: Robert Palmer

Robert Palmer singles chronology
"Discipline of Love" (re-issue) (1986)	"Sweet Lies" (1988)	"Simply Irresistible" (1988)

Audio video
- "Sweet Lies" on YouTube

"Sweet Lies" is a song by the English singer Robert Palmer, released in 1988 as a single from the soundtrack of the film of the same name. As well as appearing on the film's soundtrack release, it was also included on Palmer's 1989 compilation album Addictions: Volume 1. The song was written by Palmer, Frank Blair and Dony Wynn, and produced by Palmer.

== Background ==
Palmer's first single release since 1986, "Sweet Lies" was released by Island Records from the forthcoming Sweet Lies motion picture soundtrack. The single peaked at No. 94 on the U.S. Billboard Hot 100 chart and remained in the Top 100 for two weeks. In the UK, the song fared better, reaching No. 58 and remaining in the charts for three weeks.

In Michael Luckman's book Alien Rock: The Rock 'n' Roll Extraterrestrial Connection, Palmer is quoted as having called "Sweet Lies" "a lovely record," and confessed it wrote itself, much like his 1988 hit single "She Makes My Day". He was quoted "It came out of the blue. I was merely channeling it, these chord changes - I have no idea where that came from. I didn't give much thought to it at all. It was like automatic writing. It's nice to be in the right place at the right time, catch it unaware, and then people go, 'What's that?' and I go, 'I dunno, good isn't it?'"

== Release ==
The single was released by Island Records in America, the UK, and Europe, including Germany and Italy, and Japan. All editions of the 7" vinyl release featured the B-side "Want You More" which was taken from Palmer's 1983 album Pride. The 12" vinyl release included an extended remix of "Sweet Lies", created by Freddy Bastone. A limited edition 12" vinyl was also issued in the UK in addition to the standard one. A UK promotional 12" vinyl featured an exclusive "Dub Version" of the track, which was again created and remixed by Bastone. CD editions were released in the UK, America and Japan.

In 1989, Palmer's 1978 hit single "Bad Case of Loving You (Doctor, Doctor)" was re-issued by Island Records in the UK, Australia and New Zealand as a single from Addictions: Volume 1. The single peaked at No. 80 in the UK, with "Sweet Lies" as the B-side.

== Promotion ==
A music video was filmed to promote the single. In a March 1988 issue of the UK music magazine New Musical Express, a full A4 black and white advert was displayed based on the single. In America, a promotional poster was also issued.

== Critical reception ==
On its release, Ro Newton of Smash Hits described "Sweet Lies" as "slightly more laid-back than Palmer's previous rumbustious efforts and has really a rather peculiar sound to it". He added that Palmer "sings along with himself but in a different key just to make life interesting, all accompanied by some lazy trumpet playing". Neil Taylor of New Musical Express considered it to be an "engaging ballad" and "exactly the sort that has made Palmer into a latter day renaissance man". He praised Palmer's "sylph-like" vocals, describing him as "sounding like David Sylvian without the pretences" and added he has "the sort of classic voice that works best when not overstated". Taylor also noted the "excellent percussion" which he felt gave the song "a sort of astral feel that soothes".

== Track listing ==
7" Single

1. "Sweet Lies" - 3:09
2. "Want You More" - 3:18

12" Single (UK/German release)

1. "Sweet Lies" - 5:33
2. "Want You More" - 3:18
3. "Riptide" - 2:26

12" Single (UK release #2)

1. "Sweet Lies" - 5:33
2. "Want You More" - 3:18
3. "Riptide" - 2:26
4. "Addicted to Love" - 3:55

12" Single (Mexican release)

1. "Mentiras Dulces (Sweet Lies)" - 5:33
2. "Te Quiro Mas (Want You More)" - 3:18
3. "Rompe-Olas (Riptide)" - 2:26

12" Single (Japanese promo release)

1. "Sweet Lies" - 5:33
2. "Want You More" - 3:18
3. "Riptide" - 2:26

12" Single (Sweet Lies (Remixes) - UK promo)

1. "Sweet Lies" - 5:33
2. "Sweet Lies (Dub Version)" - 3:00
3. "Every Kinda People" - 3:19

CD Single (UK release)

1. "Sweet Lies" - 5:33
2. "Want You More" - 3:18
3. "Riptide" - 2:26

CD Single (American promo)

1. "Sweet Lies" - 3:07

CD Single (Japanese release)

1. "Sweet Lies" - 3:09
2. "Want You More" - 3:18

CD Single (Japanese release #2)

1. "Sweet Lies" - 5:33
2. "Want You More" - 3:18
3. "Riptide" - 2:26
4. "Addicted to Love" - 3:55

== Charts ==
Chart (1988)	Peak position
UK Singles Chart	58
U.S. Billboard Hot 100	94

== Personnel ==
- Robert Palmer - lead vocals, guitar, producer, arranger
- Richard Gibbs - keyboards, trombone
- Frank Blair - bass
- Dony Wynn - drums
- Tim Kramer - mixing
- Freddy Bastone - remixes of "Sweet Lies"
