= Nicolai Dunger =

Swedish singer-songwriter

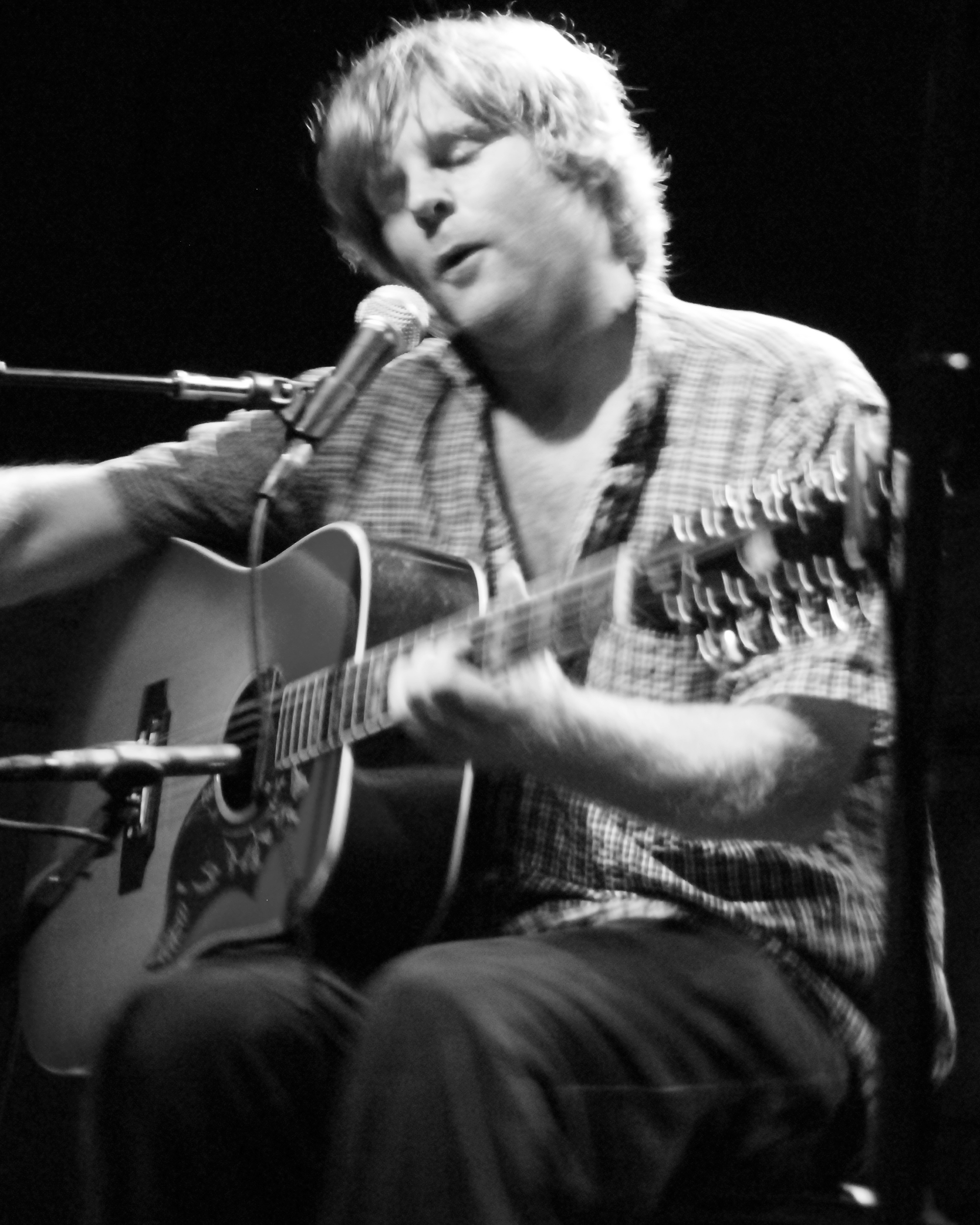
- Nicolai Dunger

Background information
- Birth name: Claus Wilhelm Nicolai Dunger
- Origin: Piteå, Sweden
- Website: nicolaidunger.se

Claus Wilhelm Nicolai Dunger is a Swedish singer and acoustic songwriter from Piteå in Sweden. He has released twelve EPs and albums, singing primarily in English, and collaborated notably with Will Oldham, the Esbjörn Svensson jazz trio and Ebbot Lundberg. He also records under the alias A Taste of Ra as well as his birth name.

== Biography ==
A Swedish-born singer who falls under blues, folk, jazz, soul music. A former association football player, Nicolai was signed by the Telegram label of Warner records, releasing two albums that did not sell enough copies to enable him to give up his part-time job as a gardener.

A meeting with Ebbot Lundberg of the Swedish band The Soundtrack of Our Lives led to two further albums, a tour with Emilíana Torrini and the use of one of his songs in an advertisement for an oil company. This small influx of cash enabled the production of a trio of vinyl albums with the Esbjörn Svensson jazz trio.

This steady production of somewhat experimental acoustic music attracted the attention of Americana musicians Will Oldham and Jonathan Donahue, and a contract with the Dolores Recordings branch of Virgin Records followed. The first album on this label, Soul Rush, with backing from the Esbjörn Svensson trio, attracted some limited attention in 2001, but the next album, 2002's Tranquil Isolation, achieved widespread attention, especially thanks to its input from Will Oldham.

A third album, Here's My Song, You Can Have It, followed in 2004. He has featured on both Nina Persson's second "A Camp" record, and on Maia Hirasawa's album GBG vs STHLM.

== Discography ==
- 1996 Songs Wearing Clothes
- 1997 Eventide
- 1999 This Cloud Is Learning
- 2000 Blind Blemished Blues
- 2001 A Dress Book
- 2001 Soul Rush
- 2002 Sweat Her Kiss
- 2002 The Vinyl Trilogy
- 2003 Tranquil Isolation
- 2004 Here's My Song, You Can Have It...I Don't Want it Anymore
- 2006 Sjunger Edith Södergran
- 2007 Rösten Och Herren
- 2008 Nicollide and the Carmic Retribution
- 2009 Play
- 2010 Original Motion Picture Soundtrack - Vallmo (duo album with Jonas Kullhammar, released on vinyl only in 300 copies)
- 2011 Ballad of This Land
- 2022 Every Line Runs Together

== Trivia ==
Dunger's song "Something in the Way" was featured in a Volvo commercial in the U.S. in July 2008. His song "Dr Zhivago's Train" was recorded by Robert Palmer on his 2003 album Drive.
