= True Love (Robert Palmer song) =

Single by Robert Palmer

from the album Rhythm & Blues
- B-side: "Big Shot"
- Released: 15 February 1999
- Genre: Pop; R&B
- Length: 3:52
- Label: Eagle
- Songwriters: Alan Mansfield; Sharon O'Neill; Robert Palmer
- Producers: Robert Palmer; Pino Pischetola

Robert Palmer singles chronology
"Respect Yourself" (1995)	"True Love" (1999)	"Addicted to Love" (Shake B4 Use remix) (2003)

Audio video
- "True Love" (album version) on YouTube

"True Love" is a song by English singer Robert Palmer, which was released in 1999 as the only single from his thirteenth studio album Rhythm & Blues. The song was written by Alan Mansfield, Sharon O'Neill and Palmer. It was produced by Palmer and Pino Pischetola.

Released as the lead single from the Rhythm & Blues album, the song saw limited commercial success, like the album. It reached No. 87 on the UK Singles Chart. It was his final single release (discounting a 2003 remix of "Addicted to Love").

== Release ==
The single was released as a CD single mainly in the UK and across European. A radio edit of "True Love" was created for its release as a single. An extended mix was also included, along with the non-album B-side "Big Shot". A promotional CD single was also created, featuring the radio edit of "True Love" as the only track.

== Promotion ==
A music video was filmed to promote the single, featuring Palmer singing the song among various clips including a couple dancing. The video was shot in black and white, with the song's lyrics scrolling along the bottom of the video. In the Netherlands, Palmer performed the song on the TV show Laat de Leeuw.

== Critical reception ==
Upon release, Billboard reviewed the single, stating: "Robert Palmer teases his new album with a track that shows that this long-innovative artist has yet to content himself with stereotypical production. He's come a long way from "Addicted to Love" with this offering that's part '80s, part sheer experimentation. His vocal is layered in double octaves, giving this midtempo love song a mysterious, exotic feel. Instrumentally, it features a persistent, assertive beat with a peppering of Asian influences and a solid hook that could hook the attention of reminiscent hot ACs. Fans will be delighted that Palmer remains vital and original, while radio may just have a pick to click." Dave Kendrick of the Hartford Courant said in a review of Rhythm & Blues: "...the songs are sunny and optimistic, and Palmer is in fine vocal form throughout. The opening track, 'True Love' sounds like a great single." AllMusic highlighted the song by labelling it an AMG Pick Track from the Rhythm & Blues album.

== Track listing ==
CD single

1. "True Love" (radio edit) – 3:52
2. "True Love" (extended mix)
3. "Big Shot" – 4:22

CD single (promo release)

1. "True Love" (radio edit) – 3:52

== Charts ==
Chart (1999)	Peak position
UK Singles (OCC)	87

== Personnel ==
- Robert Palmer – lead vocals, producer, arranger
- Pino Pischetola – producer, engineer, mixing
- Alan Mansfield – additional instruments
