= Pressure Drop (album) =

Studio album by Robert Palmer
- Released: November 1975
- Studios: Blue Seas, Hunt Valley, Maryland
- Genres: Funk; reggae
- Length: 36:54
- Label: Island
- Producer: Steve Smith

Robert Palmer chronology
| Sneakin' Sally Through the Alley (1974) | Pressure Drop (1975) | Some People Can Do What They Like (1976) |

Professional ratings
Review scores
| Source | Rating |
|---|---|
| Allmusic | 4/5 stars |
| Rolling Stone | (favorable) |
| The Rolling Stone Album Guide | 3/5 stars |

Pressure Drop is the second solo album by the English singer Robert Palmer, released in 1975. Palmer is backed by Little Feat and other musicians. The title track is a cover version of the reggae hit by Toots and the Maytals. However, many other songs on the album use "New Orleans funk ... along with smooth, dated disco ballads smothered in strings". Continuing his association with Little Feat started by his cover of "Sailing Shoes" on his 1974 debut album Sneaking Sally Through the Alley, Feat was used as backing band on several cuts, most notably Lowell George's slide guitar on "Here With You Tonight". George also contributed the tune "Trouble" on which Feat pianist Bill Payne plays the intro. David Jeffries' review says that the album is considered "too blue-eyed and polished for fans of Palmer's more gutsy moments" but concludes that "Pressure Drop has grown into the great overlooked album in Palmer's discography". In June 2009 (issue 187), the album was ranked as No. 20 on Mojo's list of the 50 best records released by Island. The album peaked at No. 136 in the US.

Songs "Give Me an Inch" and "Which of Us Is the Fool" were issued as singles; a music video was produced for the latter. According to former bandmate Pete Gage, the song "Here with You Tonight" was written towards the end of Palmer's time in Vinegar Joe.

== Track listing ==
All tracks are written by Robert Palmer, except where noted.

Side one
| No. | Title | Writer(s) | Length |
|---|---|---|---|
| 1. | "Give Me an Inch" | | 3:17 |
| 2. | "Work to Make It Work" | | 4:27 |
| 3. | "Back in My Arms" | | 3:30 |
| 4. | "River Boat" | Allen Toussaint | 3:44 |
| 5. | "Pressure Drop" | Frederick Hibbert | 5:26 |

Side two
| No. | Title | Writer(s) | Length |
|---|---|---|---|
| 1. | "Here with You Tonight" | Palmer; Pete Gage | 4:57 |
| 2. | "Trouble" | Lowell George | 2:25 |
| 3. | "Fine Time" | | 5:43 |
| 4. | "Which of Us Is the Fool" | | 3:25 |
| Total length: | | | 36:54 |

Featured on the 2013 CD reissue by Edsel (which is bundled with Sneakin' Sally Through the Alley) are acoustic demos of "Willin'" (George) and "Hope We Never Wake". Palmer rerecorded "Work to Make It Work" for his final studio album featuring original compositions, 1999's Rhythm & Blues (released in 1998 in Japan). In 2012, the song was featured in the action-adventure video game Sleeping Dogs.

== Personnel ==
- Robert Palmer – vocals, percussion
- Lowell George – guitar, backing vocals
- Bill Payne – keyboards
- Paul Barrère – guitar, backing vocals
- Richie Hayward – drums, percussion, backing vocals
- Kenny Gradney – bass guitar
- James Jamerson – bass guitar
- Sam Clayton – backing vocals
- Ed Greene – drums, percussion
- Jean Roussel – clavinet, keyboards, Hammond organ B3
- Gordon DeWitty – clavinet
- Gene Page – strings
- The Muscle Shoals Horns – horns
- Mel Collins – saxophone, flute
- Mongezi Feza – trumpet, flageolet
- Ray Allen – trombone
- Vicki Brown – backing vocals
- Fran Tate – backing vocals
- David Snell – harp
- Joe Brown – banjo
- Steve York – harmonica
- Martin Frye – tuba

=== Technical ===
- Steve Smith – production
- Phill Brown – engineering
- Graham Hughes – cover concept, design, photography
- Carinthia West – front and back cover model (uncredited)

Paul Barrère, Lowell George, Kenny Gradney, Richie Hayward, Bill Payne and Sam Clayton were members of Little Feat at the time. Fran Tate sang backup vocals on some Little Feat records, extending the Little Feat connection.

== See also ==
- List of albums released in 1975
