= Jack Waldman =

American musician (1952–1986)

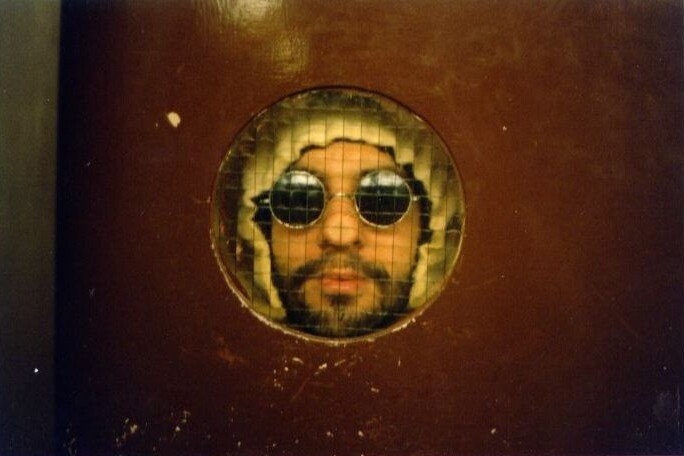
- Waldman in the early 1980s

Background information
- Born: Jack Howard Waldman; September 6, 1952; Metuchen, New Jersey
- Died: May 17, 1986 (aged 33) New York City
- Genres: Rock; jazz; electronic; funk
- Occupations: Instrumentalist; record producer; composer
- Instruments: Keyboards; synthesizer; bassoon; saxophone; flute; vocals
- Years active: 1974–1986

Jack Waldman (September 6, 1952 – May 17, 1986) was an American jazz and rock musician, composer, record producer, vocalist and multi-instrumentalist.

Waldman was best known for his studio work and performances with singer Robert Palmer, and also worked with artists such as Billy Idol, Madonna, Rob Hegel, Joe Jackson, Foreigner and Whitney Houston. He was classically trained from childhood, and played keyboards, synthesizer, bassoon, saxophone and flute. He died in 1986 from HIV-related lymphoma.

== Personal history ==
Jack Waldman was born September 6, 1952, in Perth Amboy, New Jersey, and grew up in Metuchen, New Jersey. He began classical piano lessons at the age of five, and had perfect pitch. In his teenage years, Waldman switched his focus from classical to jazz piano, studying with Morris Nanton. After attending Metuchen High School, which created the Jack Waldman Memorial Scholarship in his honor, Waldman studied at Rutgers College, Livingston College and Juilliard School of Music between 1970 and 1974. Waldman graduated in 1974 with a BA in music from Rutgers. After college, he relocated to New York City, where he remained until his death in 1986 from HIV-related lymphoma.

== Music career ==
After relocating to New York in 1974, Waldman met and performed with jazz guitarist Joe Beck. He quickly became a prolific studio musician, playing keyboards and synthesizer with well-known artists and producing remixes for single releases. Concurrently, Waldman worked on a number of independent musical projects, including Tornader with Larry Alexander, and the more noteworthy Air Force 1 with Elliot Sokolov. Waldman and Sokolov co-wrote and produced "See the Light / Feel the Heat," released in 1984 on Streetwise records, in which they sampled public domain clips of then-president Ronald Reagan. The piece, also known as the "Ronald Reagan Rap," released on Streetwise Records as "See the Light Feel the Heat" was one of the earliest records featuring entirely sampled vocals. In 1984, MTV aired a video promotion for the piece. Early in his career, Waldman began recording and performing with rock artist Robert Palmer. Waldman's first release with Palmer was Secrets in 1979, and they continued working together throughout the 1980s. Waldman also worked with more avant-garde performance artists, including Klaus Nomi. He did arrangements for Nomi, who mixed synth-driven new wave, 1920s German cabaret music, disco and opera. Other noteworthy artists with whom Waldman worked include Gloria Gaynor, Joe Jackson, Billy Idol, Rob Hegel, Foreigner, Aretha Franklin, Madonna, and Whitney Houston.

== Discography ==
Appears on:

- 1977: Glorious, Gloria Gaynor
- 1979: Niteflyte, Niteflyte
- 1979: Secrets, Robert Palmer
- 1980: Clues, Robert Palmer
- 1980: Hegel, Rob Hegel
- 1980: Ding Dong, Klaus Nomi
- 1982: Maybe It's Live, Robert Palmer
- 1982: Night and Day, Joe Jackson
- 1982: Simple Man, Klaus Nomi
- 1983: Encore!, Klaus Nomi
- 1983: Pride, Robert Palmer
- 1983: Rebel Yell, Billy Idol
- 1983: Rhythm of Life, Paul Haig
- 1983: Secret, Classix Nouveaux
- 1984: Agent Provocateur, Foreigner
- 1984: Feeling Cavalier, Ēbn-Ōzn
- 1984: Sapphire, John Martyn
- 1984: See The Light Feel the Heat, Air Force 1, Streetwise Records
- 1984: Snap, Peter Brown
- 1984: Some People, Belouis Some
- 1984: The Mexican, Jellybean John "Jellybean" Benitez
- 1984: Wotupski!?!, Jellybean John "Jellybean" Benitez
- 1984: Visitors, Motoharu Sano
- 1985: Cierta Gente, Belouis Some
- 1985: Love's Gonna Get You, Jocelyn Brown
- 1985: Riptide, Robert Palmer
- 1985: Some People, Belouis Some
- 1985: Surprise, Surprise, Various artists
- 1985: The Sun Always Shines on T.V., a-ha
- 1985: What The Papers Say, Bad Manners
- 1985: When Midnight Comes, Surgin'
- 1985: Who's Zoomin' Who, Aretha Franklin
- 1986: Frantic Romantic, Jermaine Stewart
- 1986: Shakey's Got The Blues, Seven Windows
- 1987: Holiday / Over And Over, Madonna
- 1987: One From The Heart, Jocelyn Brown
- 1987: Whitney, Whitney Houston
- 1987: You Can Dance, Madonna
- 1988: Love Will Save The Day, Whitney Houston
- 1989: 45 R.P.M. Club, a-ha
- 1989: Addictions Volume 1, Robert Palmer
- 2002: The Definitive, Foreigner
- 2007: Electro Funk Sessions, Various Artists
- 2008: Body Language Six, Various Artists
