= Best of Both Worlds (Robert Palmer song) =

Single by Robert Palmer

from the album Double Fun
- Released: April 1978
- Genre: Rock
- Length: 3:56
- Label: Island
- Songwriter: Robert Palmer
- Producer: Tom Moulton

Robert Palmer singles chronology
"You Overwhelm Me" (1978)	"Best of Both Worlds" (1978)	"You're Gonna Get What's Coming" (1978)

Audio video
- "Best of Both Worlds" on YouTube

"Best of Both Worlds" is a song by English singer Robert Palmer from his album Double Fun. The song was released as a single in April 1978 in the EU and on 23 June in the UK and has since been included on compilation albums such as Addictions: Volume II (1992) and 20th Century Masters (1999). A live version appeared on 1982's Maybe It's Live and a remix version was included on 1998's Woke Up Laughing.

== Charts ==
=== Weekly charts ===
Chart (1978–1979)	Peak position
Austria (Ö3 Austria Top 40)	25
Belgium (Ultratop 50 Flanders)	4
Netherlands (Dutch Top 40)	17
Netherlands (Single Top 100)	10
West Germany (GfK)	36
UK The Singles Chart (Record Business)	92

=== Year-end charts ===
Chart (1978)	Position
Netherlands (Mega Single Top 100)	100
