= Drive (Robert Palmer album) =

Studio album by Robert Palmer
- Released: 12 May 2003
- Genres: Blues; R&B
- Length: 33:26
- Label: Compendia
- Producer: Robert Palmer

Robert Palmer chronology
Live at the Apollo (2001)	Drive (2003)	The Very Best of the Island Years (2005)

Professional ratings
Review scores
Source	Rating
AllMusic	3/5 stars
The Independent	4/5 stars
The Guardian	3/5 stars

Drive is the fourteenth and final solo album by English singer-songwriter Robert Palmer, released in May 2003, four months before his death. Critics hailed it as the grittiest and most heartfelt album of Palmer's career.

== Background ==
Initially approached by guitarist Carl Carlton to contribute to the 2001 Robert Johnson tribute album Hellhound on My Trail, for which Palmer recorded "Milk Cow's Calf Blues" with Carlton on guitars, Palmer was then invited by Faye Dunaway to provide the soundtrack to her 2001 directorial debut The Yellow Bird, set in Mississippi and New Orleans during the 1940s and 1950s. Palmer took both signs as a good omen, and the impetus for Drive was born. Four months after the album's release Palmer died from a heart attack on 26 September 2003.

After more thoroughly researching this particular genre of music, Palmer assembled a list of fifty possible tracks, and then began the arduous task of whittling that list down to a manageable set of twelve. The selections from Drive can best be described as a loose collection of both standard and contemporary blues compositions (Robert Johnson, Little Willie John, Keb' Mo'), with a smattering of other genres, including folk (Nicolai Dunger) and calypso (Mighty Sparrow), prompting Palmer to call the result "a gut-buckety swamp thing."

== Recording and charts ==
The recording and mixing of Drive took place in both Logic Studios (Milan, Italy) and Palmer's home studio (Lugano, Switzerland). Because of the satisfaction and enthusiasm having recorded the initial twelve songs, Palmer decided to cut three more tracks ("29 Ways (To My Baby's Door)", "It Hurts Me Too" and "Stupid Cupid"), this time at the Sphere in London.

The album peaked at No. 10 on the US Blues albums chart.

== Track listing ==
US release
No.	Title	Writer(s)	Original artist	Length
1.	"Mama Talk to Your Daughter"	J. B. Lenoir; Alex Atkins	J. B. Lenoir	2:27
2.	"Why Get Up?"	Bill Carter; Ruth Ellsworth	The Fabulous Thunderbirds	3:01
3.	"Who's Fooling Who?"	Steve Barri; Michael Omartian; Harvey Price; Daniel Walsh	Bobby "Blue" Bland	2:49
4.	"Am I Wrong?"	Kevin R. Moore	Keb' Mo'	2:04
5.	"TV Dinners"	Frank Beard; Billy Gibbons; Dusty Hill	ZZ Top	3:24
6.	"Lucky"	Robert Palmer; Carl Carlton	New recording	2:22
7.	"Stella"	Slinger Francisco	Mighty Sparrow	3:59
8.	"Dr. Zhivago's Train"	Nicolai Dunger	Nicolai Dunger	3:58
9.	"Ain't That Just Like a Woman"	Claude Demetrius; Fleecy Moore	Louis Jordan and Tympany Five	1:59
10.	"Hound Dog"	Jerry Leiber and Mike Stoller	Elvis Presley	2:03
11.	"Crazy Cajun Cake Walk Band"	Jim Ford; Lolly Vegas; Pat Vegas	Redbone	3:08
12.	"I Need Your Love So Bad"	Little Willie John; Mertis John Jr.	Little Willie John	2:14
Total length:				33:26

UK release bonus tracks
No.	Title	Writer(s)	Original artist	Length
13.	"29 Ways (to My Baby's Door)"	Willie Dixon	Willie Dixon	2:42
14.	"It Hurts Me Too"	Tampa Red	Tampa Red	2:17
15.	"Stupid Cupid"	Howard Greenfield; Neil Sedaka	Connie Francis	2:09
16.	"Milk Cow’s Calf Blues"	Robert Johnson	Robert Johnson	2:20
Total length:				42:54

== Personnel ==
- Robert Palmer – lead and backing vocals, bass (1–6, 8–12)
- Dr. Gabs – pianos, Hammond organ, synthesizers, bass (7)
- Carl Carlton – guitars
- Mauro Spina – drums (1–7, 9–12), percussion (1–7, 9–12)
- James Palmer – drums (8), percussion (8)
- Franco Limido – harmonica
- Mary Ambrose – backing vocals

=== Production ===
- Robert Palmer – producer
- Pino Pischetola – recording, mixing
- Michael Frank – photography
