= Some Guys Have All the Luck =

1973 song written by Jeff Fortgang

- Side A variant of the original US single

Single by The Persuaders

from the album Best Thing That Ever Happened to Me
- B-side: "Love Attack"
- Released: July 1973
- Recorded: 1973
- Genre: R&B
- Length: 3:29
- Label: Atco
- Songwriter: Jeff Fortgang
- Producers: LeBaron Taylor; Phil Hurtt; Tony Bell (The Young Professionals)

The Persuaders singles chronology
"Bad, Bold and Beautiful, Girl" (1973)	"Some Guys Have All the Luck" (1973)	"All Strung Out on You" (1974)

"Some Guys Have All the Luck" is a song written by Jeff Fortgang. It has been a top 40 hit on the Billboard Hot 100 twice, as the original by the Persuaders in 1973 reaching No. 39. In 1982, it was covered by Robert Palmer, which was a hit in the UK peaking at No. 16. Then it was recorded by Rod Stewart in 1984 when it hit No. 10 in the U.S. and No. 32 on the Adult Contemporary chart.

== Background ==
Fortgang wrote many songs during his three years in the music industry after graduating Yale in 1971. While Fortgang eventually released a solo album in 2013, titled All the Music in the World, consisting of the demos he had created in the 1970s, "Some Guys Have All the Luck" was not one of the tracks.

== Original Persuaders version ==
The single was released from the Persuaders' album, Best Thing That Ever Happened to Me. It was their last top 40 hit in the United States, peaking at No. 7 on the R&B chart and No. 39 on the Billboard Hot 100 in December 1973.

=== Chart history ===
Chart (1973–1974)	Peak position
Canada Top Singles (RPM)	64
US Billboard Hot 100	39
U.S. Billboard Hot Soul Singles	7
US Cash Box Top 100	39

== Robert Palmer version ==
"Some Guys Have All the Luck"

Single by Robert Palmer

from the album Maybe It's Live
- B-side: "Too Good to Be True"
- Released: January 1982
- Genre: New wave; synth-pop
- Length: 3:09
- Label: Island
- Songwriters: Jeff Fortgang; Robert Palmer (uncredited)
- Producer: Robert Palmer

Robert Palmer singles chronology
"Not a Second Time" (1981)	"Some Guys Have All the Luck" (1982)	"Pride" (1982)

Music video
- "Some Guys Have All the Luck" on YouTube

In 1982, British singer Robert Palmer released a version of the song as a single from his live/studio album, Maybe It's Live. It reached No. 16 on the UK singles chart.

Palmer's version has a significantly altered melody and lyrics in comparison to other versions of the song. Palmer told Max Bell in 1989:

I was working with Moon Martin when I wrote "Some Guys". I played it to him and a few days later he said he'd just heard someone singing it in the studio across the road, which seemed impossible since I hadn't finished it myself! What happened was that I must have heard it subliminally, I think it was on Australian radio, and just hadn't realised. The only thing I remembered was the title line.

=== Reception ===
Upon its release, Ian Birch of Smash Hits described Palmer's version as "a great combination of limb-loosening rhythm and immediate melody" and predicted the song would reach the UK top 5. Sandy Robertson, writing for Sounds, noted Palmer's usual "white soul" style, though here he "persists in dabbling in a kind of ersatz demented electro-Phillybuster style". She continued, "Nicely spastic beat tempered with frantic outbursts and a Beatley catch, decorated with gilt-edged explosions. Classy, if not classic." Ian Penman of NME believed it to be "merely average" as "whatever it's all about gets buried under a variety of vain vocal mannerisms", while "a dozen rhythms battl[e] against one another for foreground space and no real rush, all just sludge". Sunie of Record Mirror wrote: "Palmer goes pop – straighter pop, leaving his blue-eyed soul days behind, but finding nothing as substantial as the Clues-period singles to replace them."

In the US, Billboard considered it "one of Palmer's most enticing singles" since "Every Kinda People". They also noted the "offbeat rhythm" and "eccentric arrangement". Cash Box commented: "This cover paints yet another picture of the ever-changing Palmer. Here he plays a jumpy electronic popper".

=== Chart history ===
Chart (1982)	Peak position
Australia (Kent Music Report)	41
Germany	52
New Zealand	49
Sweden	7
UK Singles (Official Charts Company)	16
US Billboard Top Rock Tracks	59

== Rod Stewart version ==
"Some Guys Have All the Luck"
- Artwork for UK, French, and German singles

Single by Rod Stewart

from the album Camouflage
- B-side: "I Was Only Joking"
- Released: July 20, 1984
- Studio: Lion Share, Los Angeles, California
- Genre: Pop rock
- Length: 4:36 (Album version); 4:03 (7" version/video edit)
- Label: Warner Bros.
- Songwriter: Jeff Fortgang
- Producer: Michael Omartian

Rod Stewart singles chronology
"Infatuation" (1984)	"Some Guys Have All the Luck" (1984)	"All Right Now" (1984)

Music video
- "Some Guys Have All the Luck" on YouTube

British rock singer Rod Stewart released a cover over a decade after the original Persuaders version, released as the second single from his 1984 album Camouflage. The most successful version to date, in Stewart's native country the single climbed to No. 15 on the UK Singles Chart. In the United States, the single peaked at No. 10 on the Billboard Hot 100 in October 1984, while on the US Cash Box Top 100, the single peaked at No. 16 in that same month. Stewart's version incorporated a vocal refrain from "Ain't Got No Home" by Clarence "Frogman" Henry.

Stewart began using the Palmer-style arrangement in live concerts in 2003 after Palmer's death as a tribute, with live female backup vocalists and a horn player wearing identical dresses, similar to Palmer's signature music videos.

=== Track listings ===
7-inch single

1. Some Guys Have All the Luck (7" edit) - 4:03

12-inch single

1. Some Guys Have All the Luck (LP version) - 4:36
2. Some Guys Have All the Luck (extended version) - 6:32

=== Chart history ===
Chart (1984)	Peak position
Australia (Kent Music Report)	95
Canada	16
Germany	58
Ireland	11
UK Singles (Official Charts Company)	15
US Billboard Hot 100	10
US Adult Contemporary (Billboard)	32
US Mainstream Rock (Billboard)	27
US Cash Box Top 100	16

== Other notable cover versions ==
- Reggae artist Junior Tucker recorded a version released by Island Records in 1980. Critic Robert Christgau wrote that the teenage Junior Tucker's "sweetly devastated" version was a "must-hear," and comparing it to labelmate Robert Palmer's later recording, he wrote that Tucker "owned" the song the way Sonic Youth's Kim Gordon owned "Addicted to Love."
- Louise Mandrell recorded a country version of the song in 1985, altering the lyrics to the female perspective and changing the title to "Some Girls Have All the Luck". Mandrell's version peaked at No. 22 on the Billboard Hot Country Singles chart in 1986. A music video was filmed for the song.
- Maxi Priest recorded it on his album Maxi in 1987. His version peaked at No. 12 on the UK Singles Chart.
