= Rhythm & Blues (Robert Palmer album) =

Studio album by Robert Palmer
- Released: 28 October 1998
- Studio: Compass Point (Nassau)
- Genres: Pop; R&B; blues
- Length: 48:07
- Label: Eagle
- Producers: Robert Palmer; Pino Pischetola

Robert Palmer chronology
Woke Up Laughing (1998)	Rhythm & Blues (1998)	20th Century Masters – The Millennium Collection: The Best of Robert Palmer (1999)

Singles from Rhythm & Blues
- 1. "True Love" Released: 15 February 1999

Professional ratings
Review scores
Source	Rating
AllMusic	2/5 stars
Daily Express	4/5 stars

Rhythm & Blues is the thirteenth studio album by English singer Robert Palmer. It was first released in Japan in October 1998, before being released elsewhere in 1999, and was his first new release in five years. The album reached No. 118 in the UK but did not chart in the US. Palmer's long-term girlfriend Mary Ambrose arranged strings and sang background vocals on "Twenty Million Things", a song from Lowell George's 1979 solo album Thanks, I'll Eat It Here. Sharon O'Neill co-wrote "True Love" and also provided backing vocals on "Twenty Million Things".

The album's only single, "True Love", peaked at No. 87 in the UK singles chart.

== Track listing ==
All tracks written by Robert Palmer, except where noted.

International versions

No.	Title	Writer(s)	Length
1.	"True Love"	Palmer; Sharon O'Neill; Alan Mansfield	4:19
2.	"No Problem"		3:35
3.	"I Choose You"	Palmer; Willie Hutch	4:18
4.	"Stone Cold"		4:28
5.	"Sex Appeal"		4:34
6.	"Work to Make It Work" (99)		3:33
7.	"All the Will in the World"		4:57
8.	"You're Not the Only One"		3:39
9.	"Mr. Wise Guy"		3:32
10.	"Let's Get It On" (99)	Marvin Gaye; Ed Townsend	4:09
11.	"Tennis"		4:12
12.	"Twenty Million Things"	Jed Levy; Lowell George	3:07

US version

No.	Title	Writer(s)	Length
1.	"True Love"	Palmer; O'Neill; Mansfield	4:19
2.	"No Problem"		3:35
3.	"Let's Get It On" (99)	Gaye; Townsend	4:09
4.	"Stone Cold"		4:28
5.	"Sex Appeal"		4:34
6.	"Work to Make It Work" (99)		3:34
7.	"All the Will in the World"		4:57
8.	"You're Not the Only One"		3:39
9.	"Mr. Wise Guy"		3:32
10.	"I Choose You"	Palmer; Hutch	4:18
11.	"Dance for Me"		3:53
12.	"Twenty Million Things"	Levy; George	3:09

== Personnel ==
- Robert Palmer – vocals, arrangements
- Featuring: Alan Mansfield (track 1), Bertram Engel (tracks 3, 7, 8), Bill Payne (track 12), Carl Carlton (tracks 3, 7, 8, 11), Ken Taylor (tracks 3, 7, 8), Pascal Kravetz (tracks 3, 7, 8)
- James Palmer and Mauro Spina – percussion (track 12)
- Mary Ambrose – strings (track 12), backing vocals (track 12)
- Sharon O'Neill – backing vocals (track 12)

=== Production ===
- Produced by Pino Pischetola and Robert Palmer
- Production assistant – Paul Cavanaugh
- Production coordinator – Richard Coble
- Engineered and mixed by Pino Pischetola (tracks 1–10, 12) and Alessandro Benedetto (track 11)
- Assistant engineer – Nick Friend
- Editing – Kurt Wipfli
- Mastered by Antonio Baglio
- Design concept and logo – Robert Palmer
- Art direction – Ian Ross
- Photography – Fabio Nosotti (cover) and Mark Allan (inner)
