= Can We Still Be Friends =

1978 single by Todd Rundgren

Single by Todd Rundgren

from the album Hermit of Mink Hollow
- B-side: "Out of Control" (US), "Determination" (UK)
- Released: May 1978
- Recorded: 1977
- Studio: Utopia Sound (Lake Hill)
- Genre: Power pop
- Length: 3:34
- Label: Bearsville
- Songwriter: Todd Rundgren
- Producer: Todd Rundgren

Todd Rundgren singles chronology
"Love of the Common Man" (1976)	"Can We Still Be Friends" (1978)	"You Cried Wolf" (1978)

"Can We Still Be Friends" is a song written and originally performed by American musician Todd Rundgren. It was first released in May 1978 as a single from his album Hermit of Mink Hollow, reaching No. 29 on the US Billboard Hot 100 and No. 8 in Australia. The lyrics describe the amicable end of a romantic relationship.

The song was subsequently covered by British musician Robert Palmer in 1979, appearing on his album Secrets and reaching number 52 on the US Billboard Hot 100. The song has also appeared in notable film and television productions, including Dumb and Dumber (1994) and Vanilla Sky (2001).

== Todd Rundgren version ==
Rundgren released his version on his 1978 album Hermit of Mink Hollow. In an interview with Songfacts, Rundgren said that the song was "really a song about the best possible way to end a relationship. It isn't necessarily about a specific person."

This was the only hit single on the album, reaching No. 29 on the US Billboard Hot 100, and also peaking at No. 8 in Australia and No. 37 in Canada. Rundgren played all the instruments and performed all the vocals on the track, as he did with the rest of the album.

In 1994, the song made a prominent appearance in the film Dumb and Dumber, for which Rundgren had composed the score. It also appears on the soundtrack for the 2001 film Vanilla Sky, and the TV series Nip/Tuck.

=== Critical reception ===
Cashbox felt that the song resembled Rundgren's earlier work and that his "melodic flair" would translate to crossover appeal on album oriented rock and contemporary hit radio. Record World called the song an "easy-going ballad" and said that Rundgren's "mellow voice and style should make his name one to watch in '78."

=== Charts ===
==== Weekly charts ====
Weekly chart performance for "Can We Still Be Friends"
Chart (1978)	Peak position
Australia (Kent Music Report)	8
Canada Top Singles (RPM)	37
Canada Adult Contemporary (RPM)	45
US Billboard Hot 100	63

==== Year-end charts ====
Year-end chart performance for "Can We Still Be Friends"
Chart (1978)	Position
Australia (Kent Music Report)	54

== Robert Palmer version ==
"Can We Still Be Friends"

Single by Robert Palmer

from the album Secrets
- B-side: "Too Good To Be True"
- Released: November 9, 1979
- Studio: Compass Point (Nassau, Bahamas)
- Genre: Pop rock; soul
- Label: Island
- Songwriter: Todd Rundgren
- Producer: Robert Palmer

Robert Palmer singles chronology
"Jealous" (1979)	"Can We Still Be Friends" (1979)	"What's It Take" (1979)

Audio video
- "Can We Still Be Friends" on YouTube

In 1979, "Can We Still Be Friends" became a hit again when British musician Robert Palmer recorded a version for his album Secrets.

=== Chart performance ===
Chart performance for "Can We Still Be Friends" (Robert Palmer version)
Chart (1979–1980)	Peak position
U.S. Billboard Hot 100	52
Dutch Top 40	32
