= Ridin' High (Robert Palmer album) =

Studio album by Robert Palmer
- Released: 19 October 1992
- Genres: Vocal; jazz
- Length: 49:05
- Label: EMI
- Producers: Robert Palmer; Teo Macero

Robert Palmer chronology
Addictions: Volume 2 (1992)	Ridin' High (1992)	Honey (1994)

Ridin' High is the eleventh studio album by English singer-songwriter Robert Palmer. It was his eleventh solo studio album, released in 1992 and reached number 32 in the UK Albums Chart and number 173 on the US Billboard 200. This album contains music heavily influenced by vocal and jazz standards and features the minor hit "Witchcraft", which reached number 50 in the UK. It also includes three tracks from Palmer's Don't Explain album two years earlier.

== Track listing ==
No.	Title	Writer(s)	Original artist(s)	Length
1.	"Love Me or Leave Me"	Walter Donaldson; Gus Kahn	Ruth Etting	3:44
2.	"(Love Is) The Tender Trap"	Sammy Cahn; Jimmy Van Heusen	Debbie Reynolds and Frank Sinatra	2:35
3.	"You're My Thrill"	Sidney Clare; Jay Gorney	various	3:57
4.	"Want You More"	Robert Palmer	New recording	4:07
5.	"Baby, It's Cold Outside"	Frank Loesser	Ella Fitzgerald and Louis Jordan	3:30
6.	"Aeroplane"	Palmer	Robert Palmer	3:00
7.	"Witchcraft"	Cy Coleman; Carolyn Leigh	Frank Sinatra	3:17
8.	"What a Little Moonlight Can Do"	Harry M. Woods	Violet Lorraine	2:41
9.	"Don't Explain"	Billie Holiday; Arthur Herzog Jr.	Billie Holiday	2:27
10.	"Chance"	Palmer; Alan Mansfield; Saverio Porciello	New recording	2:41
11.	"Goody Goody"	Johnny Mercer; Matty Malneck	Frankie Lymon	2:51
12.	"Do Nothing till You Hear from Me"	Duke Ellington; Bob Russell	various	3:44
13.	"Honeysuckle Rose"	Fats Waller; Andy Razaf	various	2:49
14.	"No, Not Much"	Robert Allen; Al Stillman	The Four Lads	2:22
15.	"Ridin' High"	Cole Porter	Cole Porter	2:15
16.	"Hard Head"	Eddie Curtis; Johnny "Guitar" Watson	Louis Jordan	3:05
Total length:				49:05

== Charts ==
Chart (1992)	Peak position
Australian Albums (ARIA)	175
UK Albums (OCC)	32
US Billboard 200	173

== Personnel ==
- Robert Palmer – vocals, backing vocals, arrangements (6, 10, 14), acoustic guitar (10)
- Derek Smith – acoustic piano (1–3, 5, 7–9, 11–13, 15, 16)
- Alan Mansfield – acoustic piano (6)
- William Bryant – keyboards (14)
- Dennis Budimir – guitars (1–3, 5, 7–9, 11–15), ukulele (8)
- Bucky Pizzarelli – guitars (2, 11)
- Saverio Porciello – guitars (6, 10)
- Jay Berliner – banjo (8)
- Johnny Winter – guitars (16), backing vocals (16)
- Chuck Domanico – bass guitar (1–3, 7–9, 11, 13)
- Lincoln Goines – bass guitar (5, 16)
- Frank Blair – bass guitar (6, 14)
- Guy Pratt – bass guitar (6, 10)
- Andy Simpkins – bass guitar (12, 15)
- Larry Bunker – drums (1–3, 7–9, 11–13, 15)
- Jimmy Madison – drums (5, 16)
- Dony Wynn – drums (6, 14)
- Mauro Spina – drums (10)
- John Bilezikjian – oud (4), dumbek (4)
- Cyro Baptista – percussion (6)
- Earl A. Dumler – oboe (4)
- Phil Bodner – clarinet (8)
- Dave Bargeron – trombone (8)
- Richard Gibbs – trombone (14)
- Warren Luening – trumpet (1, 5, 11)
- Lew Soloff – trumpet (8)
- Demo Morselli – trumpet (12)
- Chuck Findley – trumpet (14)
- Clare Fischer – arrangements and conductor (1–5, 7–9, 11–13, 15, 16)
- Morris Repass – orchestra manager
- Carnie Wilson – vocals (5)

=== Production ===
- David Harper – executive producer
- Teo Macero – producer
- Robert Palmer – co-producer, art direction
- Arne Frager – engineer (1–5, 7–9, 11–13, 15, 16)
- Glen Kolotkin – additional engineer
- Pino "Pinaxa" Pischetoia – mixing (1, 2, 4–8, 10–16), engineer (6, 10, 14)
- Eric "ET" Thorngren – mixing (3, 9)
- Ian Ross, Bill Smith Studio – design
- Charles Dickins – other photography
- Fabio Nosotti – main photography
- Gianfranco Ferre – clothing
