= Maybe It's Live =

Live album by Robert Palmer
- Released: March 1982
- Recorded: 10 November 1980
- Venues: Dominion Theatre, London
- Genre: Rock
- Length: 36:30
- Label: Island
- Producer: Robert Palmer

Robert Palmer chronology
Clues (1980)	Maybe It's Live (1982)	Pride (1983)

Singles from Maybe It's Live
- 1. "Some Guys Have All the Luck" Released: January 1982

Professional ratings
Review scores
Source	Rating
AllMusic	2/5 stars
Rolling Stone	3/5 stars

Maybe It's Live is a live album by Robert Palmer, released in 1982. It combines six live tracks of old songs with four new songs recorded in the studio, including "Some Guys Have All the Luck", which was a hit for Palmer in the UK, peaking at No. 16 on the UK Singles Chart.

The album peaked at No. 23 in Sweden and No. 92 in the Netherlands.

== Track listing ==
All tracks are written by Robert Palmer, except where noted.

Side one
No.	Title	Writer(s)	Length
1.	"Sneakin' Sally Through the Alley" (live)	Allen Toussaint	4:07
2.	"What's It Take?" (live)		2:54
3.	"Best of Both Worlds" (live)		3:06
4.	"Every Kinda People" (live)	Andy Fraser	4:17
5.	"Bad Case of Loving You (Doctor, Doctor)" (live)	Moon Martin	4:04

Side two
No.	Title	Writer(s)	Length
1.	"Some Guys Have All the Luck"	Jeff Fortgang	3:09
2.	"Style Kills"	Palmer; Gary Numan	4:16
3.	"Si Chatouilleux"		4:34
4.	"Maybe It's You"	David Ian Ainsworth; Danny Wilde	3:43
5.	"What Do You Care" (live)		2:20
Total length:			36:30

== Personnel ==
- Robert Palmer — vocals; bass on "Style Kills" and "Si Chatouilleux"; drums, keyboards and guitar on "Si Chatouilleux"
- Alan Mansfield — guitar (1–5, 7, 10), keyboards (1–6, 9, 10)
- Chris Bishop — bass (1–6, 10)
- Jack Waldman — keyboards (1–6, 9, 10)
- Michael Dawe — drums (1–5, 10)
- Dony Wynn — drums (6, 7, 9)
- Adrian Belew — guitar on "Si Chatouilleux"
- Kenny Mazur — guitar on "Some Guys Have All the Luck"
- Danny Wilder — bass and guitar on "Maybe It's You"
- Gary Numan — keyboards on "Style Kills"

Production

- Produced and Arranged by Robert Palmer
- Executive Producer — David Harper
- Engineers — Rhett Davies and Jack Nuber
- Assistant Engineer — Harold Dorsett
- Mixed by Jack Nuber at Compass Point Studios (New Providence, Bahamas).
- Mastered by Ted Jensen at Sterling Sound (New York, NY).
- Photography and Design — Graham Hughes
- Sculpture — Paul Wunderlich

== Charts ==
Chart (1982)	Peak position
United Kingdom (Official Charts Company)	32
United States (Billboard 200)	148
