= Sneakin' Sally Through the Alley =

Studio album by Robert Palmer
- Released: September 1974
- Studios: New Orleans; New York; Compass Point Studios
- Genres: Blue-eyed soul; New Orleans soul; R&B; funk
- Length: 35:24
- Label: Island
- Producer: Steve Smith

Robert Palmer chronology
Sneakin' Sally Through the Alley (1974)	Pressure Drop (1975)

Singles from Sneakin' Sally Through the Alley
- 1. "Sneakin' Sally Through the Alley" Released: 1975

Sneakin' Sally Through the Alley is the debut solo album by the English singer Robert Palmer, released in 1974. It followed three album releases co-fronting the band Vinegar Joe.

Palmer is backed by The Meters and Lowell George of Little Feat. Multiple reviewers have commented that Palmer sang confidently on this album, despite being backed by more accomplished musicians such as Lowell George, Art Neville and New Orleans singer-songwriter Allen Toussaint.

The album peaked at No. 107 in the Billboard 200. "Get Outside", which was released as the B-side to "Which of Us Is the Fool", a single from Palmer's next album Pressure Drop, bubbled under the Billboard Hot 100, peaking at No. 105. Neither the album nor its singles charted in the UK however.

== Composition ==
Sneakin' Sally Through the Alley is based in rhythm. Sam Sutherland called it "a polished and energetic primer in sophisticated body rhythms." As with Palmer's other early albums, it is a synthesis of "improvised funk grooves, New Orleans R&B and tasty original". Charles Shaar Murray described the music as being "of the precision-tooled remote-control funk variety". Tony Stewart considered the record to be, "considering his company of musos and recording locations, a predictable achievement in style: rhythmic R&B funk." According to Richard Williams, the tracks are "suffused with southern soul." As Smash Hits writer Mary Harron describes, the album set the tone for Palmer's next few albums in that it is characterised by "stylish funk" and "an immaculately tasteful choice of cover versions plus his own material," and notes that the material was contemporaneously labelled blue-eyed soul.

Much of the music was improvised in the studio as Palmer encouraged the rhythm musicians to play while he improvised his own percussive vocals atop. This was a process he later abandoned, saying in 1996: "I don't work that way anymore. I know better now. But I was trying for that funk-jam feel. The point was to get this groove I always had a feel for. And I got it, even more than I'd even hoped for." Palmer was initially intimidated by his assemblage of session musicians; in 1988, he commented: "The studio was full of these big black men from a heavy R&B church tradition, and I walked in and thought Yoiks! I was paying the bill but it felt like an audition. I swallowed hard and said, OK, everybody plugged in? Let's go. And 16 bars into the first tune they went, Hey, wait a minute. What did you say your name was?"

"Here was this white English kid coming to New Orleans and New York to work with bands I had only heard on vinyl. I first knew Stuff when they were called the Encyclopedia Of Soul, the seminal New York rhythm and blues band. They had been on loads of records and still had that raw edge. So, I jumped in the deep end and asked if they would be up for some sessions. They didn't know me from Adam -- and, at first, they wouldn't even say hello. But eight bars into the first tune, Purdie turned around and said, 'Sir, excuse me, what did you say your name was?' From then on, it was great."

— Robert Palmer, 1996

=== Songs ===
While most of the songs on the album were originals, the album also contained a few covers:

- The title track written by Allen Toussaint was originally sung by Lee Dorsey, and was included on his 1971 album Yes We Can. Ringo Starr covered it for his 1977 album Ringo the 4th. In 2011 it was used in the video game Driver: San Francisco.
- "Sailin' Shoes" was written by Lowell George, and originally performed by Little Feat. It was initially recorded on their 1972 album of the same title.
- "From a Whisper to a Scream" was written and originally performed by Allen Toussaint on his 1971 album Toussaint.

== Artwork and release ==
The striking album cover was the first of several Palmer covers photographed by Graham Hughes, and depicts "a stylishly dressed Palmer fleeing through a tunnel with a model clad in a lacy slip and a string of pearls." Harron wrote that the cover – showing "a beautifully groomed playboy Palmer accompanied by a model in a minimum of clothing", set the tone for Palmer's next few album sleeves. The image was inspired by scenes from Jean-Luc Godard's 1965 film Alphaville. As described by Nick DeRiso of Ultimate Classic Rock, Sneakin' Sally Through the Alley was "both novel idea and noble failure", as it only reached number 107 on the Billboard Top LPs & Tape chart in the US and did not chart anywhere else. Robert Sandall called the album "tailored for the American white R&B market" and noted its significant airplay on American college radio.

== Critical reception ==
Professional ratings
Review scores
Source	Rating
AllMusic	4/5 stars
Encyclopedia of Popular Music	3/5 stars
The Great Rock Discography	6/10
Record Collector	4/5 stars
The Rolling Stone Album Guide	3.5/5 stars

In his contemporary review for New Musical Express, Charles Shaar Murray believed Sneakin' Sally Through the Alley to be too clean, neat and restrained as an album, commenting that "it just doesn't catch fire anywhere" and writing that although Palmer "phrases nicely and slides round the notes with an admirable deftness," his voice is "too pale and cool" to offset Steve Smith's restrained production. He considered "How Much Fun" to be the only successful song. In Phonograph Record, Sam Sutherland named it an "irresistible" album on which Palmer had developed as a singer from his stint in Vinegar Joe, praising his confidence and ebullience and calling his singing a "controlled style that slips neatly through the album's percolating rhythms." He praised the album's overall "spirit of playfulness and underlying structural economy".

Retrospectively, Vik Iyengar of AllMusic wrote that although Palmer became a slick pop star in the 1980s, Sneakin' Sally displays his roots as a "soul singer deeply rooted in R&B and funk". He commented on the music's "laid-back groove" and wrote that while it is tight and solid, Palmer's voice is "revelatory", praising his supreme confidence around the "talented musicians", who in turn "feed off his vocal intensity". He recommended the album to fans of the Meters. In a review of a 1988 reissue, a writer for Rhymney Valley Express commented that the "infectious" record it is often considered Palmer's "classic" album, adding that it displays the singer's "undeniable gift for absorbing musical styles and replicating them", resulting on this instance in "a kind of rootsy Southern USA rock 'n' soul boogie" that would appeal to Little Feat fans. Reviewing a 2013 reissue, Record Collector contributor Terry Staunton called it an album of "laconic funk and R&B", a style best exemplified by "Sailin' Shoes" and the two Toussaint covers, but considered the 12-minute "Through It All There's You" to be the album's "slow-burn tour de force."

Colin Larkin, writing in The Encyclopedia of Popular Music (1997), described the album as "an artistic triumph." In The Rough Guide to Rock (1999), Chris Coe praised the opening medley of "Sailin' Shoes", "Hey Julia" and the title track for being "fifteen minutes of some of the most joyous white funk ever recorded." However, he considered the album's second half to be "disappointingly restrained" and adds that it prevents the whole album from being "a true classic." A writer in The New Rolling Stone Album Guide (2004) refers to Sneakin' Sally as Palmer's "New Orleans stopover" and considered there to be a "cool blue sense of detachment" throughout the album. In The Great Rock Discography (2006), Martin C. Strong praised the "seamless" cover of "Sailin' Shoes" and the Toussaint-penned title track, but believed that many of the songs suffered "a characterlessness that coloured much of Palmer's subsequent output."

== Track listing ==
Side one
No.	Title	Writer(s)	Length
1.	"Sailin' Shoes"	Lowell George	2:44
2.	"Hey Julia"	Robert Palmer	2:24
3.	"Sneakin' Sally Thru the Alley"	Allen Toussaint	4:21
4.	"Get Outside"	Palmer	4:32
5.	"Blackmail"	Palmer; George	2:32

Side two
No.	Title	Writer(s)	Length
1.	"How Much Fun"	Palmer	3:02
2.	"From a Whisper to a Scream"	Toussaint	3:32
3.	"Through It All There's You"	Palmer	12:17

== Personnel ==
Per sleeve notes

Musicians

- Robert Palmer – vocals (all tracks), backing vocals (1–3, 8), guitar (8), bass guitar (2), percussion (2), marimba (2)
- Vicki Brown – backing vocals (1, 2, 4)
- Mel Collins – horns (4, 8)
- Mongezi – flageolet (6), horns (8)
- Jack Vance – strings (8)
- Lowell George – guitar (1, 3, 4, 6, 7)
- Jim Mullen – guitar (2)
- Richard Parfitt – guitar (5)
- Chris Stainton – acoustic piano (7)
- Steve Winwood – acoustic piano (8)
- Onaje – electric piano (8)
- Jody Linscott – percussion (2, 3, 6)
- Gasper Lawal – percussion (4, 8)
- Steve York – harmonica (3)
- The Meters (1, 3, 6, 7)
  - Art Neville – keyboards
  - Leo Nocentelli – guitar
  - George Porter Jr. – bass guitar
  - Zigaboo Modeliste – drums
- New York Rhythm Section (4, 5, 8)
  - Richard Tee – keyboards
  - Cornell Dupree – guitar
  - Gordon Edwards – bass guitar
  - Bernard Purdie – drums

Production

- Producer: Steve Smith
- Engineer: Phill Brown, Ken Laxton, Alan Varner, Rhett Davies
- Photography: Graham Hughes

== See also ==
- List of albums released in 1974
