= Sweet Lies (film) =

1988 film by Nathalie Delon

Sweet Lies is a 1988 film from Island Pictures, directed by Nathalie Delon and starring Treat Williams as an insurance investigator in Paris who becomes the object of a bet made by three women, who start to fall for him. Its title track was performed by Robert Palmer.

== Cast ==
- Treat Williams as David Carroll
- Joanna Pacuła as Joelle
- Julianne Phillips as Dixie
- Norbert Weisser as Bill
- Brendan Kelly as Nino Scrocco
