= Some People Can Do What They Like =

Studio album by Robert Palmer
- Released: October 1976
- Recorded: Clover Studios, Los Angeles
- Genres: Blue-eyed soul; reggae; funk rock; pop rock
- Length: 36:29
- Label: Island
- Producer: Robert Palmer

Robert Palmer chronology
Pressure Drop (1975)	Some People Can Do What They Like (1976)	Double Fun (1978)

Professional ratings
Review scores
Source	Rating
AllMusic	3/5 stars
Rolling Stone	(mixed)
The Rolling Stone Album Guide	2/5 stars
The Village Voice	C+

Some People Can Do What They Like is the third solo studio album by Robert Palmer, released in 1976. It includes "Man Smart, Woman Smarter" which peaked at number 63 on the Billboard Pop Singles chart and number 46 in the UK in 1977. The album peaked at number 68 in the US. The album was dedicated to Mongezi Feza. The model on the front cover, engaging Palmer in a game of strip poker, is Playboy magazine's April 1976 Playmate of the Month, Denise Michele.

== Track listing ==
Side one
No.	Title	Writer(s)	Length
1.	"One Last Look"	Bill Payne; Fran Tate	4:22
2.	"Keep in Touch"	Robert Palmer	3:25
3.	"Man Smart (Woman Smarter)"	King Radio	2:35
4.	"Spanish Moon"	Lowell George	5:58
5.	"Have Mercy"	Don Covay	3:50

Side two
No.	Title	Writer(s)	Length
1.	"Gotta Get a Grip on You (Part II)"	Palmer; Alan Powell	3:57
2.	"What Can You Bring Me"	James Gadson	3:43
3.	"Hard Head"	Eddie Curtis	4:30
4.	"Off the Bone"	Palmer; Phill Brown; Steve Smith	2:18
5.	"Some People Can Do What They Like"	Palmer	4:09
Total length:			36:29

== Charts ==
Chart (1976/77)	Peak position
Australia (Kent Music Report)	80
United Kingdom (Official Charts Company)	46
United States (Billboard 200)	68

== Personnel ==
- Robert Palmer – vocals
- Pierre Brock, Chuck Rainey – bass guitar
- Richie Hayward, Jeff Porcaro, Spider Webb, Robert Greenidge – drums
- Chilli Charles – timbales
- Sam Clayton – percussion, congas, background vocals
- Jody Linscott – percussion, congas
- Paul Barrere – guitar, background vocals
- Freddie Harris, Carol Kaye, Freddy Wall – guitar
- Bill Payne – keyboards, background vocals
- James Allen Smith, William "Smitty" Smith – keyboards
- Greg Carroll – harmonica
- Arthur Smith – ocarina, whistle

== Production ==
- Producer – Steve Smith
- Engineered & Mixed by Phill Brown at Clover Studios (Los Angeles, CA).
- Assistant Engineer – Toby Scott
- Additional Engineer on Tracks #2, 8 & 10 – Richard Digby Smith
- Mastered by George Marino at Sterling Sound, NYC
- Cover Photography – Moshe Brakha
- Design – Ria Lewerke
- Management – Connie De Nave

== See also ==
- List of albums released in 1976
