= Looking for Clues =

Single by Robert Palmer

from the album Clues
- B-side: "What Do You Care"; "Good Care of You"; "Woke Up Laughing"
- Released: 31 October 1980
- Genre: New wave; pop; funk
- Length: 4:51 (album version); 4:15 (single version)
- Label: Island
- Songwriter: Robert Palmer
- Producer: Robert Palmer

Robert Palmer singles chronology
"Johnny and Mary" (1980)	"Looking for Clues" (1980)	"Not a Second Time" (1981)

Music video
- "Looking for Clues" on YouTube

"Looking for Clues" is a song by English musician Robert Palmer, released in 1980 as the second single from his sixth studio album Clues. Written and produced by Palmer, "Looking for Clues" reached number 33 in the UK Singles Chart, and number 5 on the US Billboard Bubbling Under the Hot 100.

A music video was filmed to promote the single. It was one of the videos to be aired on MTV's first day of broadcasting, on 1 August 1981.

== Critical reception ==
Upon its release as a single, Cash Box selected "Looking for Clues" as one of their feature picks in November 1980. They commented, "Palmer's been around awhile, but musically, he continues to shift gears and develop as an artist. He has created an immensely infectious little electronic boogie, half pop, half funk, to support his high, multi-tracked vocals, with a neat vibe break." In a retrospective review of Clues, Donald A. Guarisco of AllMusic described the song as "a clever slice of new wave pop that surprises the listener with an unexpected xylophone solo". Ultimate Classic Rock included the song as one of Palmer's top 10 songs in a retrospective look at his career.

== Track listings ==
7-inch single

1. "Looking for Clues" – 4:15
2. "What Do You Care" – 2:44

7-inch single (UK/Philippines/Netherlands release)

1. "Looking for Clues" – 4:15
2. "Good Care of You" – 2:24

7-inch single (UK alternative release)

1. "Looking for Clues" – 4:15
2. "In Walks Love Again" – 2:48

7-inch single (US/Canada release)

1. "Looking for Clues" – 4:08
2. "Woke Up Laughing" – 3:36

12-inch single (UK release)

1. "Looking for Clues" (long version) - 4:51
2. "Good Care of You" – 2:24
3. "Style Kills" – 4:16

12-inch single (European release)

1. "Looking for Clues" – 4:53
2. "Johnny and Mary" – 3:59

== Personnel ==
- Robert Palmer – vocals, bass, percussion, producer
- Jack Waldman – keyboards
- Kenny Mazur – guitar
- Dony Wynn – drums
- Chris Frantz – bass drum
- Alex Sadkin – engineer, mixing
- David Harper – executive producer
- Ted Jensen – mastering

== Charts ==
=== Weekly charts ===
Chart (1980–1981)	Peak position
Australia (Kent Music Report)	23
Belgium (Ultratop 50 Flanders)	9
Canada Top Singles (RPM)	7
Netherlands (Dutch Top 40)	15
Netherlands (Single Top 100)	17
Sweden (Sverigetopplistan)	14
Switzerland (Schweizer Hitparade)	6
UK Singles (Official Charts)	33
US Billboard Bubbling Under the Hot 100	5
West Germany (GfK)	3

=== Year-end charts ===
Year-end chart performance for "Looking for Clues"
Chart (1981)	Position
Australia (Kent Music Report)	80
