= Simply Irresistible (song) =

1988 single by Robert Palmer

- UK 7-inch vinyl variant of the standard artwork

Single by Robert Palmer

from the album Heavy Nova
- B-side: "Nova"
- Released: 31 May 1988
- Studio: Lugano, Switzerland
- Genre: Rock
- Length: 4:14
- Label: EMI
- Songwriter: Robert Palmer
- Producer: Robert Palmer

Robert Palmer singles chronology
"Sweet Lies" (1988)	"Simply Irresistible" (1988)	"She Makes My Day" (1988)

Music video
- "Simply Irresistible" on YouTube

"Simply Irresistible" is a song by English rock singer Robert Palmer, released as the lead single from his ninth studio album, Heavy Nova, in May 1988. The song reached No. 2 on the US Billboard Hot 100 chart and topped the Billboard Album Rock Tracks chart for three weeks. It earned Palmer his second Grammy Award the following year, and the song was nominated for the Brit Award for Best British Single. Cash Box called the song a "hard charging power-guitar fueled rocker".

== Music video ==
The music video for "Simply Irresistible" was directed by English fashion photographer Terence Donovan and shows Palmer surrounded by numerous women, all with the same heavy makeup and sweptback hair style. The video features women that Palmer met while visiting the Kentucky Derby (Karen Aubrey McElfresh, Kim Jones, Cheryl Day and Betty-Jo Cox). According to VH1's Pop-Up Video, the clip closes out the trilogy that began with his 1985 clips for "Addicted to Love" and "I Didn't Mean to Turn You On", showing the girls in swimsuits for the final touch.

An alternate take of the music video was edited for a Pepsi commercial.

== Charts ==
=== Weekly charts ===
Chart (1988)	Peak position
Australia (ARIA)	1
Canada Retail Singles (The Record)	1
Canada Top Singles (RPM)	2
Canada Dance/Urban (RPM)	17
Italy Airplay (Music & Media)	3
New Zealand (Recorded Music NZ)	6
UK Singles (Official Charts)	44
US Billboard Hot 100	2
US Mainstream Rock (Billboard)	1
West Germany (GfK)	57

=== Year-end charts ===
Chart (1988)	Position
Australia (ARIA)	2
Canada Top Singles (RPM)	12
US Billboard Hot 100	23
US Album Rock Tracks (Billboard)	19
