= Vinegar Joe (band) =

English blues rock band (1971–1974)

- Vinegar Joe (1972) album cover

Background information
- Origin: London, England
- Genres: Blues rock
- Years active: 1971–1974
- Label: Island
- Spinoff of: Dada
- Past members: Elkie Brooks; Pete Gage; Robert Palmer; Steve York; Dave Thompson; Conrad Isidore; Rob Tait; John Hawken; John Woods; Mike Deacon; Keef Hartley; Jim Mullen; Pete Gavin; Alan Powell

Vinegar Joe were an English Blues rock band, formed in 1971 in London. They released three albums on Island Records, but were best known for their live shows and launching the solo careers of Elkie Brooks and Robert Palmer.

== History ==
Vinegar Joe evolved out of Dada, a 12-piece Stax Records-influenced, jazz/blues rock fusion band. Dada released one eponymous album in 1970, with a line-up including vocalist Elkie Brooks and guitarist Pete Gage. Singer Robert Palmer, formerly with the Alan Bown Set, joined after the album had been recorded. Dada were signed by Ahmet Ertegun for Atlantic Records. After their US tour, Ahmet sub-licensed them to Chris Blackwell of Island Records for the UK and rest of the world, with instructions to reduce the line-up to form Vinegar Joe in 1971, adding keyboard player Dave Thompson, but the band was still without a drummer. Phil Collins had unsuccessfully applied for the job. Conrad Isidore and Rob Tait drummed on the first album. Tim Hinkley added keyboards alongside Dave Thompson, and was depicted on the cover of their debut album Vinegar Joe, which was released in April 1972 on Island Records in the UK and Atco Records in the US. The album cover featured plasticine models of the band created by John Padley.

Tim Hinkley took over from Thompson on keyboards and was succeeded by John Hawken. Drummer Rob Tait played the first series of live shows succeeded by John Woods. Mike Deacon took over on keyboards. During recording of their second album, Rock 'n' Roll Gypsies, also released in 1972, Keef Hartley played drums. Guitarist Jim Mullen also joined the band for this record and played on the US tour. The artwork for the album was supplied by Hipgnosis. Drummer Pete Gavin joined the band prior to the US tour and recording of their third and final album Six Star General released in 1973. The band dissolved in the spring of 1974. Alan Powell played drums during the band's final weeks.

Subsequently, Brooks and Palmer went on to enjoy success as solo musicians. Gage became a record producer and arranger, working with his wife Brooks (until their divorce) and a range of musicians such as Joan Armatrading, specialising in upcoming rockabilly and punk bands including Restless and King Kurt.

== Album discography ==
=== Albums ===
- Dada – Dada, 1970 (pre-Vinegar Joe), Atco Records
- Vinegar Joe – 1972, Island Records (UK), Atco Records (US) (CD reissued on Lemon Recordings)
- Rock 'n' Roll Gypsies – 1972, Island Records (UK), Atco Records (US)
- Six Star General – 1973, Island Records (UK), Atco Records (US)

=== Compilation albums ===
- Six Star Gypsies, (Edsel Records, 1993)
- Speed Queen of Ventura – An Introduction to Vinegar Joe, (Island Records, 2003)
- Vinegar Joe: The Island Recordings 1972–1973, (Cherry Red Records, 2021) 3-CD

=== Charts ===
Year	Album	Chart	Peak	Ref.
1972	Vinegar Joe			
1972	Rock 'n' Roll Gypsies	US Billboard Bubbling Under the Top Albums	201	
1973	Six Star General			

== Former members ==
- Elkie Brooks – vocals (1971–1974)
- Pete Gage – guitars (1971–1974)
- Robert Palmer – vocals (1971–1974)
- Steve York – bass (1971–1974)
- Dave Thompson – keyboards (1971–1972)
- Conrad Isidore – drums (1971–1972)
- Rob Tait – drums (1971–1972)
- John Hawken – keyboards (1972)
- John Woods – drums (1972)
- Mike Deacon – keyboards (1972–1974)
- Keef Hartley – drums (1972–1973)
- Jim Mullen – guitars (1972–1974)
- Pete Gavin – drums (1973–1974)
- Alan Powell – drums (1974)
- Mick Shaw - bass (1972)

Additional musicians

- Dave Brooks – tenor saxophone
- Tim Hinkley – keyboards
- Nick South – bass
- Gasper Lawal – percussion
