= Double Fun =

Studio album by Robert Palmer
- Released: 17 March 1978
- Studios: Hit Factory, New York City; Mediasound, New York City; Sigma Sound, Philadelphia
- Genre: Rock
- Length: 34:48
- Label: Island
- Producers: Robert Palmer; Tom Moulton

Robert Palmer chronology
Some People Can Do What They Like (1976)	Double Fun (1978)	Secrets (1979)

Singles from Double Fun
- 1. "Every Kinda People" Released: 10 March 1978; 2. "Best of Both Worlds" Released: April 1978; 3. "You Overwhelm Me" Released: June 1978 (US); 4. "You're Gonna Get What's Coming" Released: October 1978 (US)

Double Fun is the fourth solo album by Robert Palmer, released in 1978. Partially self-produced, this pop album is influenced by multiple genres including blue-eyed soul, disco and heavy rock but maintains an overall consistency of production which holds it all together. The album peaked at number 45 on the Billboard Pop Albums chart in 1978, his highest rank up to that point, and includes a top 20 hit, "Every Kinda People".

The hit single from the album "Every Kinda People" was written by former Free bassist Andy Fraser. Fraser recorded his own version of the song which he never released but which Palmer heard. This album and the hit single paved the way for his next album Secrets which reached No. 19 on the Billboard charts and gave Palmer his biggest hit yet with the Moon Martin-penned "Bad Case of Loving You (Doctor, Doctor)".

The album cracked the Billboard Top 100 peaking at No. 45 thanks to the success of "Every Kinda People", and two follow up singles continued to keep the album afloat on the charts. The last track "You're Gonna Get What's Coming" penned by Palmer later became a hit single (reaching No. 73 on the Billboard charts in 1980) for Bonnie Raitt and was featured on her 1979 album The Glow. Double Fun peaked at No. 10 in the Netherlands and No. 29 in New Zealand.

== Critical reception ==
Professional ratings
Review scores
Source	Rating
AllMusic	3.5/5 stars
Record Mirror	4/5 stars
Rolling Stone	(mixed)

The Globe and Mail noted that "Double Fun, like his others, is pristine and unwrinkled, both of which were once virtues but are now in danger of becoming vices."

== 2012 reissue ==
Double Fun was reissued on 24 January 2012 by Culture Factory USA, an independent label that specialises in cult artists. The reissue CD is packaged in a miniature replica of the original quality vinyl packaging complete with an inner sleeve that features the original lyrics, photo of Palmer and credits for the album. The label side of the CD features a replica of what the original Island label looked like at the time of issue and even features "grooves" as if the black CD is made of vinyl.

The reissues did not have any additional outtakes or bonus tracks.

== Track listing ==
All tracks are written by Robert Palmer, except where noted.

Side one
No.	Title	Writer(s)	Length
1.	"Every Kinda People"	Andy Fraser	3:17
2.	"Best of Both Worlds"		3:54
3.	"Come Over"		4:06
4.	"Where Can It Go?"		3:20
5.	Untitled (Night People)	Allen Toussaint	4:12

Side two
No.	Title	Writer(s)	Length
1.	"Love Can Run Faster"		4:02
2.	"You Overwhelm Me"		3:05
3.	"You Really Got Me"	Ray Davies	4:23
4.	"You're Gonna Get What's Coming"		4:29
Total length:			34:48

== Personnel ==
- Robert Palmer – vocals, guitar, percussion
- Paul Barrère – guitar, backing vocals
- Keith Errol Benson, Richie Hayward, Chris Parker – drums
- Harry Bluestone – concertmaster
- Michael Brecker – saxophone
- Randy Brecker – trumpet
- Pierre Brock, Jimmy Williams, Bob Babbitt – bass guitar
- Lenny Castro, Robert Greenidge – percussion
- Gene Page – string arrangements
- John Davis – string arrangements
- Freddie Harris, Neil Hubbard, James Mahoney, Donovan McKitty, T.J. Tindall – guitar
- Ron Kersey, Edward Putmon, Steve Robbins, James Allen Smith, Louis John Davis – keyboards
- Bill Payne – keyboards, backing vocals
- Don Renaldo – concertmaster
- Brenda Russell – backing vocals
- Brian Russell – backing vocals
- Allan Schwartzberg – percussion, drums

== Production ==
- Producers – Robert Palmer (Tracks #1, 3, 5, 7 & 9) and Tom Moulton (Tracks #2, 4, 6 & 8).
- Executive Producer – Chris Blackwell
- Engineers – Phill Brown (Tracks #1, 3, 5, 7 & 9), Arthur Stoppe (Tracks #1, 3, 5, 7 & 9) and Tom Moulton (Tracks #2, 4, 6 & 8).
- Recorded at The Hit Factory (New York, NY), Mediasound (New York, NY) and Sigma Sound Studios (Philadelphia, PA).
- Mastered by Jose Rodriguez at Frankford/Wayne Mastering Labs (New York, NY).
- Art Direction – Tina Bossidy and Robert Palmer
- Photography – Hiro

== Charts ==
=== Weekly charts ===
Chart (1978)	Peak position
Dutch Albums (Album Top 100)	10
New Zealand Albums (RMNZ)	29
US Billboard 200	45

=== Year-end charts ===
Chart (1978)	Position
Dutch Albums (Album Top 100)	51

== See also ==
- List of albums released in 1978
