= Secrets (Robert Palmer album) =

Studio album by Robert Palmer
- Released: 15 June 1979
- Studios: Compass Point (Nassau, Bahamas)
- Genres: Rock; hard rock; R&B
- Length: 36:29
- Label: Island
- Producer: Robert Palmer

Robert Palmer chronology
Double Fun (1978)	Secrets (1979)	Clues (1980)

Singles from Secrets
- 1. "Bad Case of Loving You (Doctor, Doctor)" Released: 25 May 1979; 2. "Jealous" Released: 17 August 1979; 3. "Can We Still Be Friends" Released: 9 November 1979

Professional ratings
Review scores
Source	Rating
AllMusic	3.5/5 stars
Rolling Stone	(mixed)

Secrets is the fifth solo album by the English singer Robert Palmer, released in 1979. It includes "Bad Case of Loving You (Doctor, Doctor)" which peaked at No. 14 on the US Billboard Hot 100 chart in 1979, and a cover of the Todd Rundgren song "Can We Still Be Friends", which peaked at No. 52 in 1980. The album peaked at No. 19 on the Billboard 200 and No. 54 in the UK Albums Chart in 1979. Palmer also scored a hit single with "Jealous" which rose to No. 31 in Canada.

The album peaked at No. 19 in the United States and charted in the Top 50 in five other countries.

== 2012 reissue ==
Culture Factory USA reissued this album in a limited edition with a replica of the original vinyl packaging on 24 January 2012. The packaging uses thick cardboard stock and the inner sleeve is a replica of the original including lyrics and credits for the original album. The album was remastered from the original mastertapes at 24 bit and then dithered down to a 16 bit CD. The label of the CD is a replica of the period vinyl Island label and is jet black with "grooves" on the label side looking very much like an LP. The edition is limited to 3000 copies worldwide. The CD doesn't have any mastering credits.

== Track listing ==
All tracks are written by Robert Palmer, except where noted.

Side one
No.	Title	Writer(s)	Length
1.	"Bad Case of Loving You (Doctor, Doctor)"	Moon Martin	3:10
2.	"Too Good to Be True"		2:54
3.	"Can We Still Be Friends"	Todd Rundgren	3:37
4.	"In Walks Love Again"		2:45
5.	"Mean Ol' World"	Andy Fraser	3:33
6.	"Love Stop"	John David	2:57

Side two
No.	Title	Writer(s)	Length
1.	"Jealous"	Jo Allen	3:15
2.	"Under Suspicion"	Dennis Linde; Alan Rush	3:25
3.	"Woman You're Wonderful"	Palmer; Allen	3:57
4.	"What's It Take?"		3:26
5.	"Remember to Remember"		3:30
Total length:			36:29

== Personnel ==
- Robert Palmer – vocals, production
- Pierre Brock – bass guitar
- Dony Wynn – drums
- Kenny Mazur – guitar
- Steve Robbins, Jack Waldman – keyboards

Technical

- Karl Pitterson – engineer, mix
- Benjamin Armbrister, Kendall Stubbs – assistant engineers
- Greg Calbi – mastering at Sterling Sound (New York, NY).
- Susan Palmer – cover concept, design
- Graham Hughes – art direction, photography

== Charts ==
Chart (1979)	Peak position
Australia (Kent Music Report)	23
United Kingdom (Official Charts Company)	54
United States (Billboard 200)	19

== See also ==
- List of albums released in 1979
