= Pride (Robert Palmer album) =

Studio album by Robert Palmer
- Released: April 1983
- Studios: Compass Point (Nassau, Bahamas); Farmyard (Little Chalfont, England)
- Genres: Dance-pop; R&B; funk
- Length: 38:39
- Label: Island
- Producer: Robert Palmer

Robert Palmer chronology
Maybe It's Live (1982)	Pride (1983)	Riptide (1985)

Singles from Pride
- 1. "Pride" Released: 19 November 1982; 2. "You Are in My System" Released: March 1983; 3. "You Can Have It (Take My Heart)" Released: June 1983

Professional ratings
Review scores
Source	Rating
AllMusic	3/5 stars

Pride is the seventh studio album by the English singer Robert Palmer, released in April 1983 by Island Records. The album peaked at No. 37 in the UK Albums Chart. The album also peaked at No. 12 in France, No. 15 in the Netherlands and No. 36 in Sweden.

== Critical reception ==
In a contemporaneous review, The Globe and Mail found that Palmer "has created a synthesis of English mainstream pop and heavy black rhythms, utilizing various combinations of more roots-oriented West Indian music such as calypso and soca, the almost-tribal rhythms of such West African musicians as King Sunny Ade, and to a lesser degree, the more familiar patterns of urban American funk." A retrospective review concluded that "[the] suave British musician's 1983 project added a new, contemporary funk edge to his musical palette", and noted that the album, "once again self-produced, showed a typically eclectic range of styles". Another reviewer found that "The Silver Gun”, which is sung in Urdu, is "a very haunting and bizarre track, which displays the incredible versatility of Robert Palmer’s voice."

== 2011 reissue ==
Pride was reissued in 2011 by Culture Factory USA, an independent label that specialises in cult artists. The reissue CD was packaged in a miniature replica of the original vinyl packaging, has replica of the original Island records label, and is black so as to resemble vinyl. It was limited to 3,000 copies and did not have any additional outtakes or bonus tracks.

== Track listing ==
All songs written and composed by Robert Palmer, except where noted.

Side one
No.	Title	Writer(s)	Length
1.	"Pride"		3:27
2.	"Deadline"		3:53
3.	"Want You More"		3:26
4.	"Dance for Me"		3:42
5.	"You Are in My System"	David Frank; Mic Murphy	4:20

Side two
No.	Title	Writer(s)	Length
6.	"It's Not Difficult"		3:41
7.	"Say You Will"	Rupert Hine; Robert Palmer	3:46
8.	"You Can Have It (Take My Heart)"	Kool & the Gang; J.T. Taylor; George Brown; Claydes Smith	3:07
9.	"What You Waiting For"		3:44
10.	"The Silver Gun"	Palmer; Alan Powell	5:33
Total length:			38:39

== Personnel ==
- Robert Palmer – vocals, keyboards, guitars, arrangements
- Rupert Hine – keyboards
- Alan Mansfield – keyboards, guitars
- Jack Waldman – keyboards
- David Frank – keyboards (5)
- Frank Blair – bass guitar
- Michael Dawe – drums
- Dony Wynn – drums
- Bill Bonaparte – steel drums

=== Production ===
- David Harper – executive producer
- Robert Palmer – producer
- Jack Nuber – engineer, mixing at Soundworks (New York, NY)
- Paul Jarvis – engineer (5), technician
- Dominique Blanc-Francard – mixing at Continental Studio (Paris, France)
- Kendall Stubbs – technician
- Translab (Paris, France) – mastering location
- Bert Kitchen – cover painting

== Charts ==
Chart (1983)	Peak position
Australia (Kent Music Report)	89
United Kingdom (Official Charts Company)	37
United States (Billboard 200)	112

== See also ==
- List of albums released in 1983
