= Clues (Robert Palmer album) =

Studio album by Robert Palmer
- Released: August 1980
- Recorded: December 1979 – June 1980
- Studios: Compass Point (Nassau, Bahamas)
- Genres: New wave; synth-pop; dance-rock; electronic rock
- Length: 31:17
- Label: Island
- Producer: Robert Palmer

Robert Palmer chronology
Secrets (1979)	Clues (1980)	Maybe It's Live (1982)

Professional ratings
Review scores
Source	Rating
AllMusic	4/5 stars
Pitchfork	8.0/10

Clues is the sixth studio album by the English singer Robert Palmer, released in 1980. It has a rockier, new wave edge compared to his previous releases. The album peaked at number 59 on the Billboard Top Pop Albums chart and No. 31 in the UK in 1980. The album also peaked at No. 1 in Sweden, No. 3 in France, No. 15 in the Netherlands and No. 42 in Italy.

The video to the first track on the album, "Looking for Clues", aired on MTV's first day of broadcasting on 1 August 1981.

The album was certified gold in Germany by BMieV in 1992.

== Songs ==
Andy Fraser, the former bassist of Free and the author of Palmer's first breakthrough single "Every Kinda People", played bass on the album on two songs. New wave musician Gary Numan co-wrote a song with Palmer (another co-write between the two appearing on Maybe It's Live) and played keyboards on a remake of his own song "I Dream of Wires". This was first issued on CD in 1985 when Island's catalogue was issued under WEA Manufacturing. The WEA pressings are sought-after collector's items.

The lead track, "Looking for Clues" was described by AllMusic as "a clever slice of new wave pop that surprises the listener with an unexpected xylophone solo". Palmer, who played percussion on Talking Heads' Remain in Light, had the favour returned when the band's drummer Chris Frantz played bass drum on "Looking for Clues".

"I Dream of Wires" is a cover of a song from Gary Numan's album Telekon released the same year.

The cover of the Beatles' "Not a Second Time", featured a second verse added by Palmer.

== Critical reception ==
Cashbox said that "the hypnotic, quirky style of "Looking For Clues" and "Johnny and Mary" and the rocking "Sulky Girl" supply the LP's best moments." The also felt that Palmer had pivoted away from the blue-eyed soul found on his earlier albums "in favor of a more modern techno-rock style." Billboard commented that Palmer's vocals took on "an icy monotone while the instrumentation provides the color and spark". The believed that every song on the album was "accessible to a mass audience" and singled out "Looking For Clues" and Johnny and Mary" as songs that would particularly perform well with a dance rock crowd. Record World singled out "Johnny and Mary" as "unforgettable".

Donald Guarisco of AllMusic described Clues as "one of Robert Palmer's strongest and most consistent albums", despite being somewhat short at 31 minutes.

== Track listing ==
All tracks are written by Robert Palmer, except where noted.

Side one
No.	Title	Length
1.	"Looking for Clues"	4:52
2.	"Sulky Girl"	4:07
3.	"Johnny and Mary"	3:59
4.	"What Do You Care"	2:44
Total length:		31:17

Side two
No.	Title	Writer(s)	Length
1.	"I Dream of Wires"	Gary Numan	4:34
2.	"Woke Up Laughing"		3:36
3.	"Not a Second Time"	Palmer; Lennon–McCartney	2:48
4.	"Found You Now"	Palmer; Numan	4:37
Total length:			31:17

== Personnel ==
- Robert Palmer – vocals, guitars, bass, percussion
- Jack Waldman – keyboards
- Gary Numan – keyboards (5)
- Kenny Mazur – guitars (1, 2, 7)
- Alan Mansfield – guitars (3)
- Andy Fraser – bass (2, 7)
- Paul Gardiner – bass (5)
- Dony Wynn – drums
- Chris Frantz – bass drum (1)

Production

- David Harper – executive producer
- Robert Palmer – producer
- Alex Sadkin – engineer, mixing
- Cass Rigby – tape operator
- Sly Roker – tape operator
- Ted Jensen – mastering at Sterling Sound (New York, NY)
- Graham Hughes – cover
- Cover photograph taken by Susan Palmer in Nassau, Bahamas

== Charts ==
=== Weekly charts ===
Chart (1980–1981)	Peak position
Australian Albums (Kent Music Report)	26
Canadian Albums (RPM)	9
Dutch Albums (Album Top 100)	16
German Albums (Offizielle Top 100)	6
New Zealand Albums (RMNZ)	21
Swedish Albums (Sverigetopplistan)	1
UK Albums (Official Charts)	31
US Billboard 200	59

=== Year-end charts ===
Chart (1981)	Position
German Albums (Offizielle Top 100)	16

== Certifications and sales ==
Region	Certification	Certified units/sales
Canada (Music Canada)	Gold	50,000^{^}
Germany (BVMI)	Gold	250,000^{^}
^{^} Shipments figures based on certification alone.

== See also ==
- List of albums released in 1980
