= Moon Martin =

American singer-songwriter and guitarist (1945–2020)

- Born: John David Martin; October 31, 1945; Altus, Oklahoma, United States
- Died: May 11, 2020 (aged 74) Encino, Los Angeles, California, United States
- Genres: New wave; power pop
- Occupations: Musician; songwriter
- Instruments: Guitar; vocals
- Years active: 1960s–2020
- Formerly of: The Disciples; Southwind
- Website: Official website (Archived)

John David "Moon" Martin (October 31, 1945 – May 11, 2020) was an American singer-songwriter and guitarist.

== Early years ==
Born in Altus, Oklahoma, United States, he was originally a rockabilly artist as a member of the Oklahoma-based band The Disciples, who moved to Los Angeles and adopted the name Southwind in 1967. At this time, their style shifted towards country rock. Southwind released three studio albums before disbanding in 1971. They enjoyed moderate success, with two of their singles charting nationally: "Ready to Ride" (No. 127 in 1969) and "Boogie Woogie Country Girl" (No. 105 in 1970).

== Peak of success ==
Martin gained recognition in the 1970s as a pop artist and composer. He wrote the songs "Bad Case of Loving You (Doctor, Doctor)", made famous by the British singer Robert Palmer, and "Cadillac Walk", made famous by the American singer Willy DeVille.

In the September 1979 issue of Trouser Press, Jon Young's article "New Moon Rising" described elements of Martin's life to that point, including an incident in Lake Geneva, Wisconsin, in which Martin and his band parked off a dirt road, to get some sleep, as it turned out, near the "summer home of Wrigley's chewing gum", and woke up to someone dressed in a waiter's jacket knocking on the car door. On the 13 October 1979 edition of American Top 40, Casey Kasem added the detail that the waiter offered hors d'oeuvres to Martin and his band.

Martin scored five minor hits of his own with "Rolene" (No. 30 US, No. 77 Australia, No. 30 Canada), "No Chance" (No. 50 US), both in 1979, "Signal for Help" (No. 60 Australia) in 1981, "X-Ray Vision", (No. 99) and "Aces With You" (No. 95) both in Australia in 1982. His 1982 song, "X-Ray Vision" was an MTV hit music video. He allegedly was given the nickname "Moon" because many of his songs had the word "moon" in the lyrics.

On October 31, 2022, Midnight Moon, a posthumous album, was released, only available on several music streaming services.

== Death ==
Martin died on May 11, 2020, of natural causes in Encino, California, at the age of 74.

== Discography ==
=== Studio albums ===
Title	Details	Peak chart positions		
Title	Details	US	CAN	AUS
Shots from a Cold Nightmare	Released: 1978; Label: Capitol Records	—	—	—
Escape from Domination	Released: 1979; Label: Capitol Records	80	67	—
Street Fever	Released: 1980; Label: Capitol Records	138	—	63
Mystery Ticket	Released: 1982; Label: Capitol Records	205	—	—
Mixed Emotions	Released: 1985; Label: Capitol France	—	—	—
Dreams on File	Released: 1992; Label: Fnac France	—	—	—
Cement Monkey	Released: 1993; Label: CORE	—	—	—
Lunar Samples	Released: 1995; Label: CORE	—	—	—
Louisiana Juke-Box	Released: 1999; Label: Sonodisc France-Eagle UK	—	—	—
Midnight Moon (posthumous)	Released: 2022; Label: Joanne Gough	—	—	—
"—" denotes releases that did not chart.

=== Live album ===
- Bad News Live (1993, Fnac France)

=== Compilation albums ===
- The Very Best Of (1999, EMI Sweden, 1978-1982)
- Shots from a Cold Nightmare + Escape from Domination (1995, EMI Special Markets, Demon Records)
- Street Fever + Mystery Ticket (1995, EMI Special Markets, Edsel Records)

=== Singles ===
Year	Single	Peak chart positions				Album
Year	Single	US	US AC	US Dance	AUS	Album
1978	"Victim of Romance"	—	—	—	—	Shots from a Cold Nightmare
1978	"Bad Case of Lovin' You"	—	—	—	—	Shots from a Cold Nightmare
1978	"Hot Nite in Dallas"	—	—	—	—	Shots from a Cold Nightmare
1979	"Rolene"	30	—	—	77	Escape from Domination
1979	"No Chance"	50	36	—	—	Escape from Domination
1979	"Dreamer"	—	—	—	—	Escape from Domination
1979	"I've Got a Reason"	—	—	—	—	Escape from Domination
1979	"Bootleg Woman"	—	—	—	—	Escape from Domination
1980	"Bad News"	—	—	—	—	Street Fever
1980	"Signal for Help"	—	—	—	60	Street Fever
1980	"Pushed Around"	—	—	—	—	Street Fever
1980	"Love Gone Bad"	105	—	—	—	Street Fever
1980	"Five Days of Fever"	—	—	—	—	Street Fever
1982	"X-Ray Vision"	—	—	67	99	Mystery Ticket
1982	"Firing Line"	—	—	—	—	Mystery Ticket
1982	"Aces with You"	—	—	—	95	Mystery Ticket
1985	"Love Sniper"	—	—	—	—	Mixed Emotions
1992	"Rock N' Roll Radio"	—	—	—	—	Dreams On File
1993	"Never Could Say Goodbye"	—	—	—	—	Cement Monkey
1995	"Enemy"	—	—	—	—	Lunar Samples
"—" denotes releases that did not chart or were not released in that territory.
