= Every Kinda People =

Single by Robert Palmer

from the album Double Fun
- B-side: "Keep in Touch" (EU); "How Much Fun" (US)
- Released: 10 March 1978
- Genre: Calypso; pop; reggae rock
- Length: 3:17 (album version); 3:25 (1989 version); 3:47 (1992 remix)
- Label: Island
- Songwriter: Andy Fraser
- Producer: Tom Moulton

Robert Palmer singles chronology
| "One Last Look" (1977) | "Every Kinda People" (1978) | "You Overwhelm Me" (1978) |

Audio video
- "Every Kinda People" on YouTube

Music video
- "Every Kinda People" (1992 remix) on YouTube

"Every Kinda People" is a song originally performed by English singer and songwriter Robert Palmer on his fourth solo album, Double Fun (1978). It was released by Island Records as the album's lead single on 10 March 1978 in the EU and 24 March in the UK. The song was written by Andy Fraser and produced by Tom Moulton.

== Original version ==
The song reached number 53 in the United Kingdom and at number 16 in the United States, making Palmer's first top 40 hit in that country. The original version also charted on the US Billboard Adult Contemporary chart, peaking at number 22. In Canada, it reached number 12 on the RPM chart and became his first top 40 hit in the country.

== 1992 remix ==
Palmer released a re-mixed version of this song on his 1992 compilation album Addictions: Volume 2, as the lead single from that album, ultimately becoming a radio hit, peaking at number 8 on the US Billboard Adult Contemporary chart. In the UK, the remix did better than its original 1978 release, peaking at number 43. In Canada, the remix peaked at number 26.

== Critical reception ==
Cashbox characterised the song as having an "elegant soul/pop feel" and "a gentle funk bottom" with "rich and smooth vocals". Record World called it a "sensitive, interesting ballad" and said that the "steel drums provid[ed] the chief melodic hook here".

== Personnel ==
- Robert Palmer – vocals, guitar
- Paul Barrere, Freddie Harris – guitar
- James Alan Smith – keyboards
- Bob Babbitt – bass
- Allan Schwartzberg – drums
- Robert Greenidge – steel drums
- Jody Linscott – percussion

== Charts ==
=== 1978 original version ===
| Chart (1978) | Peak position |
|---|---|
| Canada Top Singles (RPM) | 12 |
| UK Singles (OCC) | 53 |
| US Hot 100 (Billboard) | 16 |
| US Adult Contemporary (Billboard) | 22 |

==== Year-end charts ====
| Chart (1978) | Position |
|---|---|
| Canada Top Singles (RPM) | 84 |
| US Hot 100 (Billboard) | 73 |

=== 1992 remix ===
| Chart (1992) | Peak position |
|---|---|
| Australia (ARIA) | 157 |
| Canada Top Singles (RPM) | 26 |
| Europe (European Dance Radio) | 20 |
| UK Singles (Official Charts) | 43 |
| UK Airplay (Music Week) | 26 |
| UK Club Chart (Music Week) | 82 |
| US Adult Contemporary (Billboard) | 8 |

== Jo O'Meara cover ==
British singer and S Club member Jo O'Meara recorded a cover of Robert Palmer's "Every Kinda People" for the 2002 film The Guru and its soundtrack. The track plays during the film's end credits and was also featured as a bonus track on S Club's fourth studio album, Seeing Double, also released in 2002.
