= Bad Case of Loving You (Doctor, Doctor) =

- UK vinyl variant of European artwork, also used for the back cover of the parent album Secrets

Single by Robert Palmer

from the album Secrets
- B-side: "Love Can Run Faster"
- Released: 25 May 1979
- Genre: Pop rock; hard rock; arena rock
- Length: 3:10
- Label: Island
- Songwriter: Moon Martin

Robert Palmer singles chronology
"You're Gonna Get What's Coming" (1978)	"Bad Case of Loving You (Doctor, Doctor)" (1979)	"Jealous" (1979)

Audio video
- "Bad Case of Loving You (Doctor, Doctor)" on YouTube

Music video
- "Bad Case of Loving You (Doctor, Doctor)" (1989 remix) on YouTube

"Bad Case of Loving You (Doctor, Doctor)" is a 1978 song, written and originally recorded by American musician Moon Martin and covered a year later by British singer Robert Palmer. Palmer's version of the song became one of his best-known hit singles.

== Background ==
Moon Martin originally recorded the song in 1978. Martin's record label Capitol Records released the song in the United Kingdom and Spain as a stand-alone vinyl single, but inserted the song into the United States release of Martin's album Shots from a Cold Nightmare. His original recording did not enter the music charts.

== Robert Palmer version ==
A year later, the song appeared on Robert Palmer's album Secrets. In Palmer's home country, the United Kingdom, the song debuted and peaked at #61 on the UK Singles Chart on July 7, 1979.

The version became more successful in other countries. In the United States, Palmer's version reached #14 on the Billboard Hot 100, #10 on the Cash Box Top 100, and #1 on the Canadian RPM chart in 1979. The Palmer version was remixed with heavier guitars and drums for his greatest hits collection Addictions: Volume 1. The song was nominated for Best Male Rock Vocal Performance at the 22nd Annual Grammy Awards. In the Netherlands, it reached #2 on the Dutch Top 40 chart on August 4, 1979, five weeks after its debut (July 7) on the chart. In New Zealand, it reached #20 in the Top 40 Singles Chart on the week of October 7, 1979, five weeks after its debut at #43 on the chart (September 9).

The song begins with a stanza written in typical eight-bar blues structure and chord sequence and then progresses to a 10-bar blues chorus.

Billboard reviewer Ed Harrison praised Palmer's rendition as "the kind of intelligent rock tune."

== Chart performance ==
Weekly charts

Chart (1979)	Peak position
Australia (Kent Music Report)	13
Belgium (Ultratop 50 Flanders)	19
Canadian RPM	1
France	9
Netherlands (Top 40 Singles)	27
Netherlands (Single Top 100)	31
New Zealand (Recorded Music NZ)	20
UK Singles Chart	61
US Billboard Hot 100	14
US Cash Box Top 100	10
US Record World	9

Year-end charts

Chart (1979)	Rank
Australia (Kent Music Report)	76
Canada	35
US Billboard Hot 100	92
US Cash Box	76
