= Robert Palmer =

English musician (1949–2003)

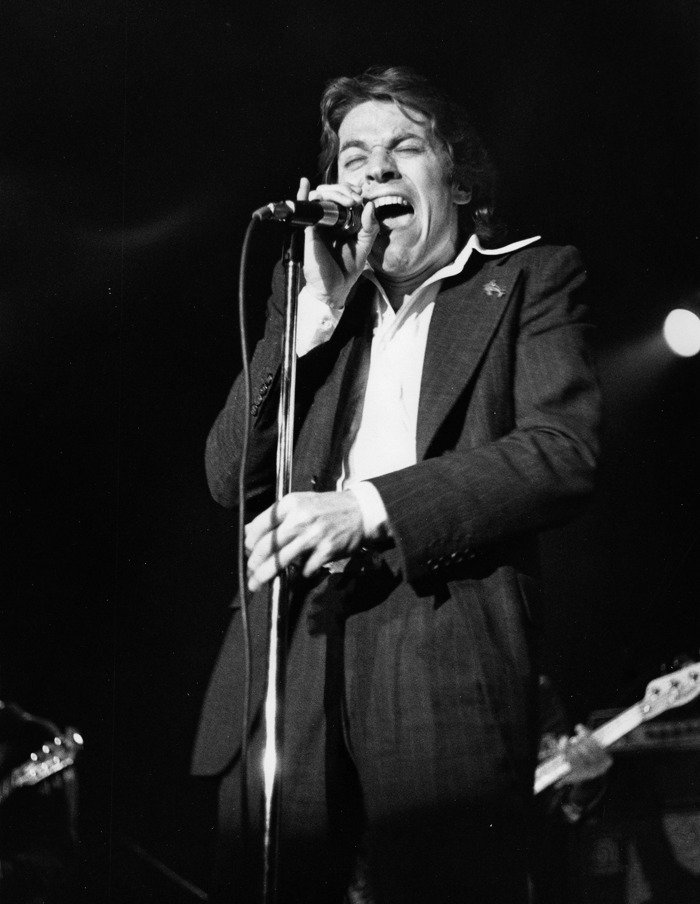
- Palmer performing in 1976

Background information
- Born: Robert Allen Palmer; 19 January 1949; Batley, West Riding of Yorkshire, England
- Died: 26 September 2003 (aged 54) Paris, France
- Genres: Rock; pop; blue-eyed soul; hard rock; blues rock
- Occupations: Singer; songwriter; record producer
- Instruments: Vocals; guitar; bass
- Works: Discography
- Years active: 1964–2003
- Labels: Island; EMI
- Formerly of: The Alan Bown Set; Dada; Vinegar Joe; The Power Station
- Spouse: Susan Thatcher (m. 1970; div. 1993)
- Website: robertpalmer.com

Robert Allen Palmer (19 January 1949 – 26 September 2003) was an English singer and songwriter. He was known for his powerful and soulful voice, sartorial elegance and stylistic explorations, combining soul, funk, jazz, rock, pop, reggae and blues. His 1986 single "Addicted to Love" and its accompanying video came to "epitomise the glamour and excesses of the 1980s".

Having begun in the music industry in the 1960s, Palmer was a vocalist in the UK band Vinegar Joe in the 1970s before having success as a solo artist in the 1980s. He was also a member of the band the Power Station, who scored Top 10 hits in the UK and the US. Three of his solo hit singles, including "Addicted to Love", featured music videos directed by the English photographer and film director Terence Donovan.

Palmer received a number of awards throughout his career, including two Grammy Awards for Best Male Rock Vocal Performance and an MTV Video Music Award. He was also nominated for the Brit Award for British Male Solo Artist in both 1987 and 1989. He died at the age of 54 from a heart attack.

== Career ==
=== 1964–1973: Early bands ===
Robert Allen Palmer was born on 19 January 1949 in Batley. When he was only a few months old, he and his family moved to Malta, where his father worked in British naval intelligence. He was influenced as a child by blues, soul, and jazz music played on American Forces Radio and by his parents' musical tastes. His family returned to the UK when he was 12.

In his teens, Palmer moved to Scarborough. He joined his first band, the Mandrakes, at the age of 15 while still at Scarborough High School for Boys. He left school the next year, after obtaining six O-levels and briefly studied art at Scarborough School of Art & Design, before landing a job at the Scarborough Evening News. He was reportedly fired after police found "the stub of a cannabis joint in a raid on his bedsit".

Palmer's first major break came with the departure of singer Jess Roden from the band the Alan Bown Set in 1969, after which Palmer was invited to London to sing on the band's single "Gypsy Girl". The vocals for the album The Alan Bown!, originally recorded by Roden (and released in the US that way), were re-recorded by Palmer after the success of the single. According to music journalist Paul Lester, Palmer rose from northern clubs in England to become "elegant and sophisticated" and the master of several styles.

In 1970, he joined the 12-piece jazz-rock fusion band Dada, which featured singer Elkie Brooks and her husband Pete Gage. After a year, Palmer, Brooks, and Gage formed soul/rock band Vinegar Joe. Palmer played rhythm guitar in the band and shared lead vocals with Brooks. Signed to the Island Records label, the band released three albums: Vinegar Joe (1972), Rock 'n' Roll Gypsies (1972), and Six Star General (1973), before disbanding in March 1974. Brooks later said Palmer "was a very good-looking guy", and that female fans were happy to find that Brooks and Palmer were not romantically linked.

=== 1974–1978: Early solo career ===
Island Records signed Palmer to a solo deal in 1974. His first solo album, Sneakin' Sally Through the Alley, recorded in 1974 in New Orleans was heavily influenced by the music of Little Feat and the funk fusion of the Meters, who acted as the backing band along with producer/guitarist Lowell George of Little Feat. Unsuccessful in the UK, both the album and single reached the top 100 in the US. Notably, "Sailin' Shoes" (the album's first track, and a Little Feat cover), Palmer's own "Hey Julia" and the Allen Toussaint-penned title track carry virtually the same rhythm, and were packaged on the album as a "trilogy" without a pause between them.

After relocating with his wife to New York City, Palmer released Pressure Drop, named for the cover version of the reggae hit by Toots and the Maytals, in November 1975 (featuring Motown bassist James Jamerson). He toured with Little Feat to promote the reggae and rock infused album. With the failure of the follow-up album, Some People Can Do What They Like, Palmer decided to move to Nassau, Bahamas directly across the street from Compass Point Studios.

In 1978, he released Double Fun, a collection of Caribbean-influenced rock, including a cover of the Kinks' "You Really Got Me". The album reached the top 50 on the US Billboard chart and scored a top 20 single with the Andy Fraser-penned "Every Kinda People" which featured Philly Sound bassist Bob Babbitt. The song has been covered by other artists including Chaka Demus and Pliers, Randy Crawford, the Mint Juleps (produced by Trevor Horn), and Amy Grant. It reached number 16 on the Billboard Hot 100.

=== 1979–1984: Growing mainstream success ===
Palmer's next album was an artistic departure, concentrating on pure rock. 1979's Secrets produced his second top 20 single with Moon Martin's "Bad Case of Loving You (Doctor, Doctor)". The number 14 hit also gave Palmer his second Billboard Hot 100 year-end chart hit. The following year saw the release of Clues, produced by Palmer and featuring Chris Frantz and Gary Numan, which generated hits on both sides of the Atlantic, first with the radio-friendly single "Johnny and Mary" and then "Looking for Clues". Catchy music videos matching the synth-pop stylings of new wave gave him much-needed exposure to a younger audience. The success was repeated with the 1982 EP release of Some Guys Have All the Luck. Going into the 1980s, Palmer's increasing commercial success as a performer fuelled his work as a producer, including on Jamaican ska legend Desmond Dekker's 1981 album Compass Point. In 1984, he helped Island label-mate John Martyn in the production of his album Sapphire.

April 1983 saw the release of Pride. While not as commercially successful as Clues, it featured the title song and Palmer's cover of the System's "You Are in My System", with the System's David Frank on keyboards. On 31 May 1983, Palmer's concert at the Hammersmith Palais was recorded and broadcast on BBC Radio 1. On 23 July 1983, he performed at Duran Duran's charity concert at Aston Villa football ground striking up friendships with members of Duran Duran which later spawned the supergroup the Power Station.

=== 1985–1989: The Power Station and MTV success ===
When Duran Duran went on hiatus, guitarist Andy Taylor and bassist John Taylor joined former Chic drummer Tony Thompson and Palmer to form the Power Station. Their album The Power Station, recorded mainly at the New York recording studio after which the band was named, with overdubs and mixing at Compass Point Studios in Nassau, reached the top 20 in the UK and the top 10 in the US. It spawned two hit singles with "Some Like It Hot" (US number 6) and a cover of the T. Rex song "Get It On (Bang a Gong)", which peaked one position higher than the original at US number nine. Palmer performed live with the band only once that year, on Saturday Night Live. The band toured and played Live Aid, with singer Michael Des Barres after Palmer bowed out at the last moment to go back into the recording studio and further his solo career.

Some critics described Palmer's abandonment of the tour as being unprofessional. In Number One magazine, he countered the claims that he joined the band for money: "Firstly, I didn't need the money and, secondly the cash was a long time coming. It wasn't exactly an experience that set me up for retirement." He also was accused of ripping off the Power Station sound for his own records. He responded, "Listen, I gave the Power Station that sound. They took it from me, not the other way around."

==== Riptide and move to EMI ====
Palmer recorded the album Riptide at Compass Point Studios in 1985, recruiting Thompson and Andy Taylor to play on some tracks plus Power Station record producer Bernard Edwards, who worked with Thompson in Chic, to helm the production. Riptide featured the single "Addicted to Love", which reached number 1 in the United States and number 5 in the United Kingdom. The single was accompanied by a memorable and much-imitated music video, directed by Terence Donovan, in which Palmer is surrounded by a bevy of near-identically clad, heavily made-up female models simulating musicians. Donovan also directed videos for the hits "Simply Irresistible" and "I Didn't Mean to Turn You On". All three videos contain similar elements, with women in heavy makeup and with near identical clothes and appearances. In September 1986, Palmer performed "Addicted to Love" at the 1986 MTV Video Music Awards in Los Angeles. In 1987, he won the Grammy Award for Best Male Rock Vocal Performance for "Addicted to Love". At the 1987 Brit Awards, Palmer received his first nomination for Best British Male Solo Vocal.

Another single from Riptide, his cover of Cherrelle's "I Didn't Mean to Turn You On", also performed well (US number two, UK number nine). Another song, "Trick Bag", was written by one of his major influences, New Orleans R&B artist Earl King.

Concerned about the rising crime rate in Nassau and having landed a deal with EMI, Palmer moved to Lugano, Switzerland in 1987 and set up his own recording studio. Producing Heavy Nova in 1988, Palmer returned to experimenting this time with bossa nova rhythms, heavy rock and white-soul balladeering. He repeated his previous success of "Addicted to Love" with the video of "Simply Irresistible", again with a troupe of female dancers in heavy makeup. The song reached number two in the US and was Palmer's final top ten hit there. The ballad "She Makes My Day" also proved to be a hit in the UK, peaking at number 6. In 1989, he won a second Grammy for "Simply Irresistible", which would later be featured in the Tony Award-winning musical Contact. At the 1989 Brit Awards, Palmer received his second nomination for Best British Male Solo Vocal, and "Simply Irresistible" was nominated for Best British Single. Rolling Stone magazine voted Palmer the best-dressed rock star for 1990.

=== 1990s: Continued success ===
Palmer expanded his range further for his next album, Don't Explain (1990). It featured two UK top 10 hits with covers of Bob Dylan's "I'll Be Your Baby Tonight" (a collaboration with UB40) and Marvin Gaye's "Mercy Mercy Me". Throughout the 1990s, Palmer ventured further into diverse material. The 1992 album Ridin' High was a tribute to the Tin Pan Alley era.

In 1994, Palmer released Honey to mixed reviews. While the album failed to produce any hit singles in the US, the album had three modest hit singles in the UK, "Girl U Want", "Know by Now", and "You Blow Me Away". In 1995 he released a greatest hits album, which reached number 4 in the UK. Also in 1995 he reunited with other members of the Power Station to record a second album. Bassist John Taylor eventually backed out of the project, to be replaced by Bernard Edwards. Palmer and the rest of the band completed the album Living in Fear (1996), and had just begun touring when Edwards died from pneumonia.

In 1997, Palmer performed with Rod Stewart at Wembley.

== Personal life ==
Palmer met Susan 'Sue' Eileen Thatcher, his future wife, at Slough railway station, in 1969, attracted by her style (silver-coloured boots and matching mini-dress) and by the science-fiction book she was reading. They married in January 1970, on his 21st birthday. They had two children. The family moved to New York City in the mid-1970s and then to the Bahamas a few years later. In 1987, Palmer and his family moved to Lugano, Switzerland. The couple divorced in 1993.

While he had not lived in Yorkshire for several decades, in the last interview he gave on 24 September 2003, Palmer said that the region, and his father, had given him "a healthy work ethic, and a straight-forwardness".

== Death ==
Palmer died from a heart attack in a Paris hotel room on 26 September 2003 at age 54. Palmer was in Paris after having recorded a television appearance in London for My Kinda People, a Yorkshire TV retrospective. His long-term partner and musical colleague, Mary Ambrose, had joined him in Paris for a planned two-day break from the television studio.

Among those who paid tribute were Duran Duran, saying, "He was a very dear friend and a great artist. This is a tragic loss to the British music industry." A memorial service was held in Lugano.

== Awards and nominations ==
| Award | Year | Nominee(s) | Category | Result | Ref. |
|---|---|---|---|---|---|
| ASCAP Pop Music Awards | 1986 | "Addicted to Love" | Most Performed Songs | Won | |
| ASCAP Pop Music Awards | 1990 | "Simply Irresistible" | Most Performed Songs | Won | |
| Grammy Awards | 1980 | "Bad Case of Loving You" | Best Rock Vocal Performance, Male | Nominated | |
| Grammy Awards | 1987 | "Addicted to Love" | Song of the Year | Nominated | |
| Grammy Awards | 1987 | "Addicted to Love" | Record of the Year | Nominated | |
| Grammy Awards | 1987 | "Addicted to Love" | Best Rock Vocal Performance, Male | Won | |
| Grammy Awards | 1989 | "Simply Irresistible" | Best Rock Vocal Performance, Male | Won | |
| MTV Video Music Awards | 1986 | "Addicted to Love" | Video of the Year | Nominated | |
| MTV Video Music Awards | 1986 | "Addicted to Love" | Best Male Video | Won | |
| MTV Video Music Awards | 1986 | "Addicted to Love" | Best Stage Performance in a Video | Nominated | |
| MTV Video Music Awards | 1986 | "Addicted to Love" | Best Overall Performance | Nominated | |
| MTV Video Music Awards | 1986 | "Addicted to Love" | Viewer's Choice | Nominated | |
| MTV Video Music Awards | 1987 | "I Didn't Mean to Turn You On" | Best Male Video | Nominated | |
| Pollstar Concert Industry Awards | 1987 | Tour | Small Hall Tour of the Year | Won | |

== Discography ==
Studio albums

- Sneakin' Sally Through the Alley (1974)
- Pressure Drop (1975)
- Some People Can Do What They Like (1976)
- Double Fun (1978)
- Secrets (1979)
- Clues (1980)
- Maybe It's Live (1982) (half studio tracks, half live)
- Pride (1983)
- Riptide (1985)
- Heavy Nova (1988)
- Don't Explain (1990)
- Ridin' High (1992)
- Honey (1994)
- Rhythm & Blues (1998)
- Drive (2003)
