= The Unfortunate Return of the Ridiculously Self-Indulgent, Ill-Advised Vanity Tour =

2022–23 concert tour by "Weird Al" Yankovic

- Tour by "Weird Al" Yankovic
- Location: Europe; North America; Oceania
- Start date: April 26, 2022
- End date: March 26, 2023
- Legs: 3
- No. of shows: 159
- Supporting act: Emo Philips

"Weird Al" Yankovic concert chronology
- Strings Attached Tour (2019); The Unfortunate Return of the Ridiculously Self-Indulgent, Ill-Advised Vanity Tour (2022–2023); Bigger & Weirder (2025–2026)

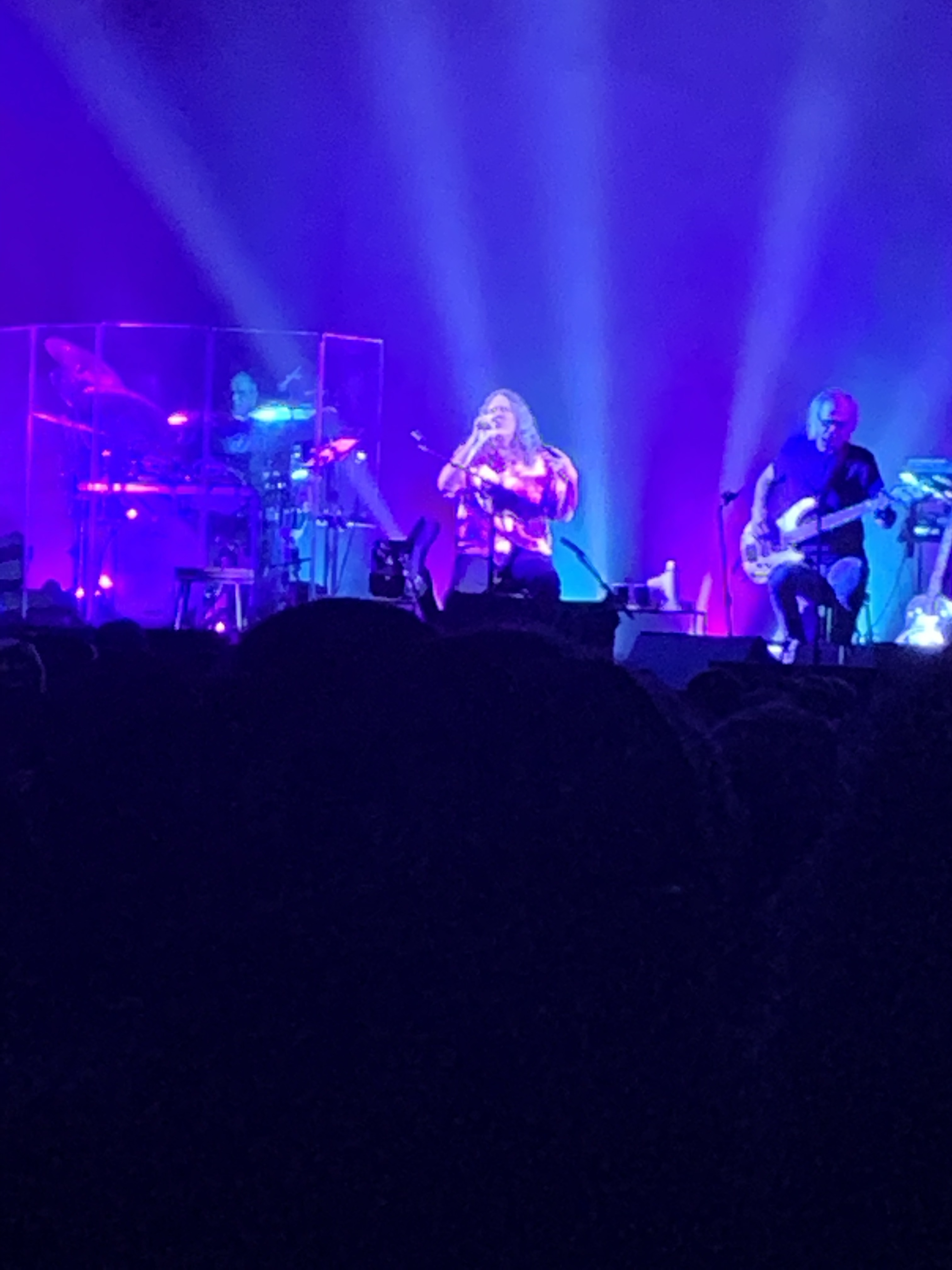
Yankovic on tour in Tulsa Theater

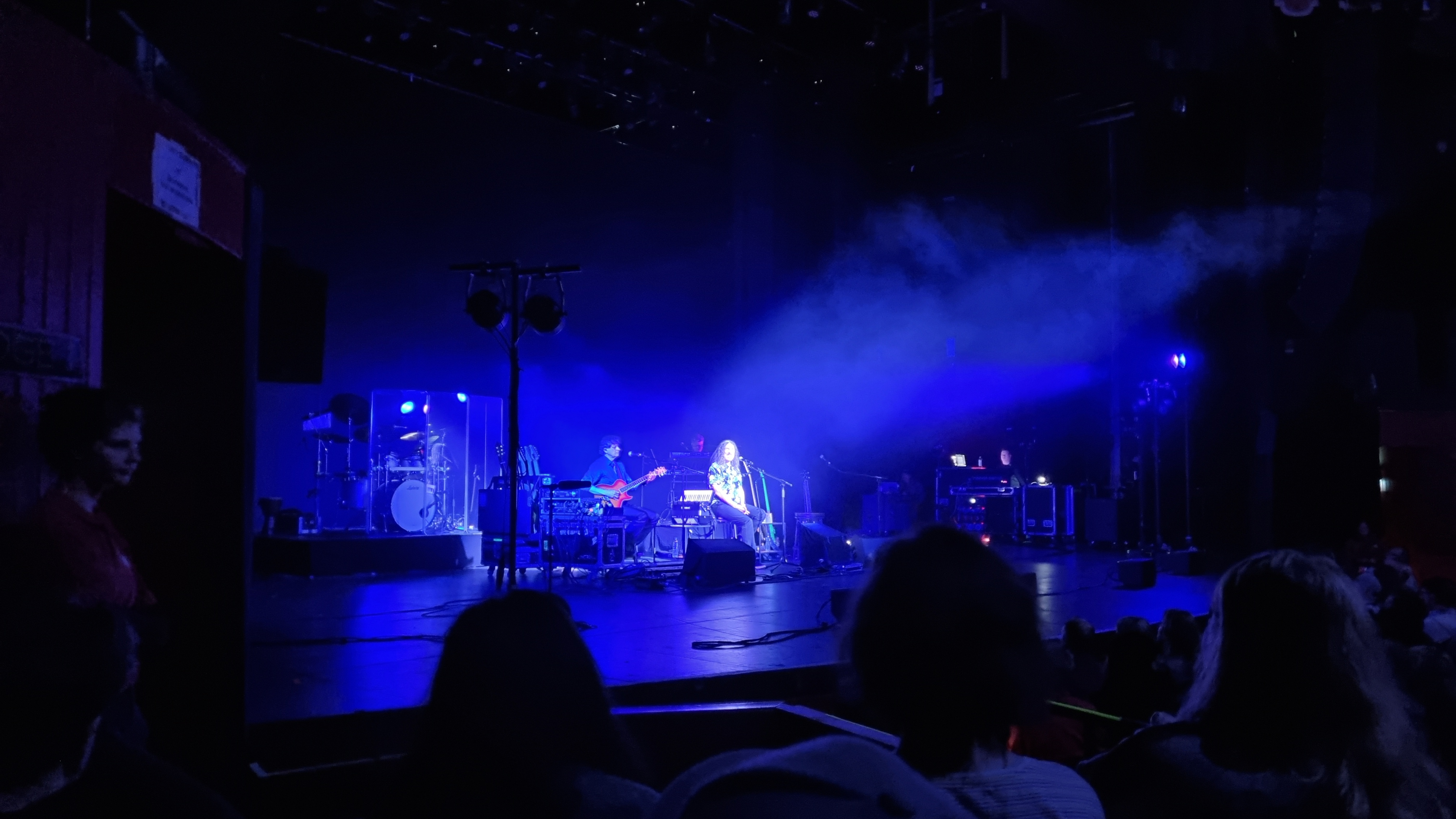
Yankovic on tour in Stockholm

The Unfortunate Return of the Ridiculously Self-Indulgent, Ill-Advised Vanity Tour was a concert tour hosted by American musician and satirist "Weird Al" Yankovic. The tour was a follow-up to the format of Yankovic's 2018 Ridiculously Self-Indulgent, Ill-Advised Vanity Tour. To that end, his website stated that the tour would consist mostly of his original, non-parody songs. The tour began on April 26, 2022, at the Bardavon 1869 Opera House in Poughkeepsie, United States, and concluded on March 26, 2023, at the Castle Theater in Kahului, United States.

== Background ==
The tour was announced on December 3, 2021. Yankovic had stated that the tour would be "scaled down with limited production in smaller theatres and intimate settings", as well as stating that he would be performing his original non-parody songs, exclaiming that the 2018 tour was the most fun he ever had and wanted to do it again. Emo Philips was also announced as the opening act for the tour, which he had previously been on Yankovic's 2018 tour. On May 18, 2022, Yankovic postponed his performances in Saginaw, Detroit, Nashville and Springfield after testing positive for COVID-19.

== Set list ==
Each performance featured a different set list. The following songs had been in regular rotation:

- "Airline Amy"
- "Albuquerque"
- "The Biggest Ball of Twine in Minnesota"
- "Bob"
- "Buy Me a Condo"
- "Christmas at Ground Zero"
- "Close but No Cigar"
- "CNR"
- "Craigslist"
- "Dare to Be Stupid" (lounge version)
- "Dog Eat Dog"
- "Don't Download This Song"
- "First World Problems"
- "Frank's 2000" TV"
- "Fun Zone"
- "Generic Blues"
- "Good Old Days"
- "I Remember Larry"
- "I'll Sue Ya"
- "Lame Claim to Fame"
- "Let Me Be Your Hog"
- "Melanie"
- "Midnight Star"
- "Mr. Popeil"
- "My Baby's in Love With Eddie Vedder"
- "My Own Eyes"
- "Nature Trail to Hell"
- "The Night Santa Went Crazy"
- "One More Minute"
- "Skipper Dan"
- "UHF"
- "Velvet Elvis"
- "When I Was Your Age"
- "Why Does This Always Happen to Me?"
- "You Don't Love Me Anymore"
- "Young, Dumb & Ugly"
- "Your Horoscope for Today"
- Unplugged Medley ("Amish Paradise", "Smells Like Nirvana", "White & Nerdy", "Word Crimes", "Yoda")

Encore songs

- "You Can Call Me Al" by Paul Simon
- "867-5309/Jenny" by Tommy Tutone
- "Not Fade Away" by The Crickets
- "Glad All Over" by The Dave Clark Five
- "China Grove" by The Doobie Brothers
- "Last Train to Clarksville" by The Monkees
- "Werewolves of London" by Warren Zevon
- "Tutti Frutti" by Little Richard
- "Saturday Night's Alright for Fighting" by Elton John
- "Nobody but Me" by The Isley Brothers
- "Stuck in the Middle with You" by Stealers Wheel
- "Radio Radio" by Elvis Costello
- "Girl U Want" by DEVO
- "Beat on the Brat" by Ramones
- "All Right Now" by Free
- "Mama Told Me Not to Come" by Randy Newman
- "Blister in the Sun" by Violent Femmes
- "It's Only Rock 'n Roll (But I Like It)" by The Rolling Stones
- "Do Wah Diddy Diddy" by The Exciters
- "Crocodile Rock" by Elton John
- "(You Make Me Feel Like) A Natural Woman" by Aretha Franklin
- "We're An American Band" by Grand Funk Railroad
- "It's the End of the World as We Know It (And I Feel Fine)" by R.E.M.
- "Rebel Yell" by Billy Idol
- "Land of 1000 Dances" by Chris Kenner
- "She's Got Everything" by The Kinks
- "Cleveland Rocks" by Ian Hunter
- "All Star" by Smash Mouth
- "Viva Las Vegas" by Elvis Presley
- "Gimme Some Lovin'" by Spencer Davis Group
- "Suffragette City" by David Bowie
- "God Save the Queen" by Sex Pistols
- "Cinnamon Girl" by Neil Young & Crazy Horse
- "Foxy Lady" by The Jimi Hendrix Experience
- "Psycho Killer" by Talking Heads
- "Sunshine of Your Love" by Cream
- "Squeeze Box" by The Who
- "Peaches" by The Presidents of the United States of America
- "American Woman" by The Guess Who
- "Everybody's Got Something to Hide Except Me and My Monkey" by The Beatles
- "Sweet Home Alabama" by Lynyrd Skynyrd
- "Refugee" by Tom Petty and the Heartbreakers
- "Born to Be Wild" by Steppenwolf

== Tour dates ==
List of 2022 concerts
Date	City	Country	Venue	Opening act(s)
April 26	Poughkeepsie	United States	Bardavon 1869 Opera House	Emo Philips
April 27	Albany	United States	Kitty Carlisle Hart Theatre	Emo Philips
April 29	New Bedford	United States	Zeiterion Performing Arts Center	Emo Philips
April 30	Orono	United States	Collins Center for the Arts	Emo Philips
May 1	Hampton Beach	United States	Hampton Beach Casino Ballroom	Emo Philips
May 3	Portland	United States	Merrill Auditorium	Emo Philips
May 4	New London	United States	Garde Arts Center	Emo Philips
May 6	Medford	United States	Chevalier Theatre	Emo Philips
May 7	Medford	United States	Chevalier Theatre	Emo Philips
May 8	Burlington	United States	Flynn Center for the Performing Arts	Emo Philips
May 10	Ridgefield	United States	Ridgefield Playhouse	Emo Philips
May 11	Rochester	United States	Kodak Hall	Emo Philips
May 13	Huntington	United States	Paramount Theater	Emo Philips
May 14	Wilkes-Barre	United States	F.M. Kirby Center	Emo Philips
May 15	Erie	United States	Warner Theatre	Emo Philips
May 17	Canton	United States	Palace Theatre	Emo Philips
May 24	Milwaukee	United States	Uihlein Hall	Emo Philips
May 25	Evansville	United States	Victory Theatre	Emo Philips
May 27	Pelham	United States	The Caverns	Emo Philips
May 28	Pelham	United States	The Caverns	Emo Philips
May 29	Nashville	United States	Ryman Auditorium	Emo Philips
May 31	Little Rock	United States	Robinson Center	Emo Philips
June 1	Tulsa	United States	Tulsa Theater	Emo Philips
June 3	Denver	United States	Ellie Caulkins Opera House	Emo Philips
June 4	Denver	United States	Ellie Caulkins Opera House	Emo Philips
June 5	Salt Lake City	United States	Capitol Theatre	Emo Philips
June 6	Boise	United States	Morrison Center	Emo Philips
June 8	Las Vegas	United States	Venetian Theatre	Emo Philips
June 10	Las Vegas	United States	Venetian Theatre	Emo Philips
June 11	Las Vegas	United States	Venetian Theatre	Emo Philips
June 12	Reno	United States	Reno Ballroom	Emo Philips
June 15	San Francisco	United States	Golden Gate Theatre	Emo Philips
June 16	San Francisco	United States	Golden Gate Theatre	Emo Philips
June 18	Los Angeles	United States	Wiltern Theatre	Emo Philips
June 19	Los Angeles	United States	Wiltern Theatre	Emo Philips
June 20	Santa Barbara	United States	Granada Theatre	Emo Philips
June 21	Bakersfield	United States	Fox Theater	Emo Philips
June 24	Spokane	United States	Martin Woldson Theater at the Fox	Emo Philips
June 25	Bend	United States	Hayden Homes Amphitheater	Emo Philips
June 26	Portland	United States	Arlene Schnitzer Concert Hall	Emo Philips
June 28	Seattle	United States	Moore Theatre	Emo Philips
June 29	Seattle	United States	Moore Theatre	Emo Philips
June 30	Eugene	United States	Silva Concert Hall	Emo Philips
July 2	Vancouver	Canada	The Centre in Vancouver	Emo Philips
July 4	Edmonton	Canada	Winspear Centre	Emo Philips
July 5	Calgary	Canada	Jack Singer Concert Hall	Emo Philips
July 6	Calgary	Canada	Jack Singer Concert Hall	Emo Philips
July 8	Regina	Canada	Conexus Arts Centre	Emo Philips
July 9	Saskatoon	Canada	TCU Place	Emo Philips
July 10	Winnipeg	Canada	Burton Cummings Theatre	Emo Philips
July 11	Duluth	United States	Symphony Hall	Emo Philips
July 14	Madison	United States	Overture Hall	Emo Philips
July 15	Chicago	United States	Symphony Center Orchestra Hall	Emo Philips
July 16	Chicago	United States	Symphony Center Orchestra Hall	Emo Philips
July 19	Cedar Rapids	United States	Paramount Theatre	Emo Philips
July 20	Columbia	United States	Missouri Theatre	Emo Philips
July 22	Lincoln	United States	Lied Center for Performing Arts	Emo Philips
July 23	Mankato	United States	Mayo Clinic Health System Event Center	Emo Philips
July 24	Minneapolis	United States	State Theatre	Emo Philips
July 26	Elkhart	United States	Lerner Theatre	Emo Philips
July 27	Akron	United States	Goodyear Theater	Emo Philips
July 29	Lewiston	United States	Mainstage Theatre	Emo Philips
July 30	Ottawa	Canada	Centrepointe Theatre	Emo Philips
August 1	Toronto	Canada	Danforth Music Hall	Emo Philips
August 2	Toronto	Canada	Danforth Music Hall	Emo Philips
August 3	Williamsport	United States	Martin Theatre	Emo Philips
August 5	Webster	United States	Indian Ranch	Emo Philips
August 6	Lancaster	United States	American Music Theatre	Emo Philips
August 7	Lancaster	United States	American Music Theatre	Emo Philips
August 9	Newport News	United States	Diamonstein Concert Hall	Emo Philips
August 10	Richmond	United States	Carpenter Theatre	Emo Philips
August 12	Wilmington	United States	Wilson Center	Emo Philips
August 13	Charlotte	United States	Belk Theater	Emo Philips
August 14	Charleston	United States	Rivers Performance Hall	Emo Philips
August 17	Knoxville	United States	Tennessee Theatre	Emo Philips
August 18	Greenville	United States	Peace Concert Hall	Emo Philips
August 19	Huntsville	United States	Mark C. Smith Concert Hall	Emo Philips
August 20	Birmingham	United States	Alabama Theatre	Emo Philips
August 22	Ashland	United States	Paramount Arts Center	Emo Philips
August 23	Dayton	United States	Mead Theatre	Emo Philips
August 25	Grand Rapids	United States	GLC Live at 20 Monroe	Emo Philips
August 26	Benton Harbor	United States	Mendel Center	Emo Philips
August 27	Louisville	United States	Iroquois Amphitheater	Emo Philips
August 28	Chesterfield	United States	Chesterfield Amphitheater	Emo Philips
August 30	Springfield	United States	Gillioz Theatre	Emo Philips
August 31	Topeka	United States	Topeka Performing Arts Center	Emo Philips
September 1	Wichita	United States	Cotillion Ballroom	Emo Philips
September 2	Kansas City	United States	Muriel Kauffman Theatre	Emo Philips
September 4	Midwest City	United States	Hudiburg Chevrolet Center	Emo Philips
September 6	Colorado Springs	United States	El Pomar Great Hall	Emo Philips
September 7	Grand Junction	United States	Avalon Theatre	Emo Philips
September 9	Greeley	United States	Monfort Concert Hall	Emo Philips
September 10	Santa Fe	United States	Crosby Theatre	Emo Philips
September 11	Chandler	United States	Chandler Center for the Arts	Emo Philips
September 13	Riverside	United States	Fox Performing Arts Center	Emo Philips
September 15	Paso Robles	United States	Vina Robles Amphitheatre	Emo Philips
September 16	Temecula	United States	Pechanga Showroom Theater	Emo Philips
September 17	Santa Clarita	United States	Santa Clarita Performing Arts Center	Emo Philips
September 18	Thousand Oaks	United States	Fred Kavli Theatre	Emo Philips
September 20	Napa	United States	Uptown Theater	Emo Philips
September 21	Saratoga	United States	Mountain Winery	Emo Philips
September 22	Santa Rosa	United States	Ruth Finley Person Theater	Emo Philips
September 24	Davis	United States	Jackson Hall	Emo Philips
September 25	San Diego	United States	Balboa Theatre	Emo Philips
September 26	San Diego	United States	Balboa Theatre	Emo Philips
September 27	Tucson	United States	Fox Tucson Theatre	Emo Philips
September 29	Lubbock	United States	Helen DeVitt Jones Theater	Emo Philips
September 30	Dallas	United States	Majestic Theatre	Emo Philips
October 1	Houston	United States	Cullen Performance Hall	Emo Philips
October 2	Austin	United States	ACL Live at Moody Theater	Emo Philips
October 4	San Antonio	United States	Majestic Theatre	Emo Philips
October 6	Memphis	United States	Graceland Soundstage	Emo Philips
October 7	Shreveport	United States	Strand Theatre	Emo Philips
October 8	Lafayette	United States	Heymann Performing Arts Center	Emo Philips
October 9	Pensacola	United States	Saenger Theatre	Emo Philips
October 11	Melbourne	United States	King Center for the Performing Arts	Emo Philips
October 12	Fort Lauderdale	United States	Parker Playhouse	Emo Philips
October 13	Fort Lauderdale	United States	Parker Playhouse	Emo Philips
October 15	Clearwater	United States	Ruth Eckerd Hall	Emo Philips
October 16	Orlando	United States	Walt Disney Theater	Emo Philips
October 17	Orange Park	United States	Thrasher-Horne Center for the Arts	Emo Philips
October 19	Washington, D.C.	United States	Kennedy Center	Emo Philips
October 21	Atlanta	United States	Atlanta Symphony Hall	Emo Philips
October 22	Atlanta	United States	Atlanta Symphony Hall	Emo Philips
October 23	Raleigh	United States	Duke Energy Center	Emo Philips
October 25	Roanoke	United States	Berglund Performing Arts Theater	Emo Philips
October 26	Pittsburgh	United States	Carnegie Music Hall	Emo Philips
October 28	Philadelphia	United States	Miller Theater	Emo Philips
October 29	New York City	United States	Stern Auditorium	Emo Philips

List of 2023 concerts
Date	City	Country	Venue	Opening act(s)
February 2	Kalamazoo	United States	State Theatre	Emo Philips
February 3 (Note: The concert in Nashville on February 3, 2023, was originally scheduled on May 21, 2022, but had to be rescheduled due to health issues.)	Nashville	United States	Brown County Music Center	Emo Philips
February 4 (Note: The concert in Springfield on February 4, 2023, was originally scheduled on May 22, 2022, but had to be rescheduled due to health issues.)	Springfield	United States	Sangamon Auditorium	Emo Philips
February 6 (Note: The concert in Saginaw on February 6, 2023, was originally scheduled on May 18, 2022, but had to be rescheduled due to health issues.)	Saginaw	United States	Temple Theatre	Emo Philips
February 7 (Note: The concert in Detroit on February 7, 2023, was originally scheduled on May 20, 2022, but had to be rescheduled due to health issues.)	Detroit	United States	Fisher Theatre	Emo Philips
February 10	Dublin	Ireland	Mahoney Hall	Emo Philips
February 12	Glasgow	Scotland	O_{2} Academy Glasgow	Emo Philips
February 13	Manchester	England	O_{2} Apollo Manchester	Emo Philips
February 14	Birmingham	England	O_{2} Academy Birmingham	Emo Philips
February 16	London	England	London Palladium	Emo Philips
February 18	Brussels	Belgium	Cirque Royal	Emo Philips
February 19	Tilburg	Netherlands	013	Emo Philips
February 20	Utrecht	Netherlands	TivoliVredenburg	Emo Philips
February 21	Paris	France	Casino de Paris	Emo Philips
February 23	Hamburg	Germany	Laeiszhalle	Emo Philips
February 24	Aalborg	Denmark	Musikkens Hus	Emo Philips
February 25	Aarhus	Denmark	Musikhuset Aarhus	Emo Philips
February 27	Copenhagen	Denmark	DR Koncerthuset	Emo Philips
February 28	Oslo	Norway	Folketeateret	Emo Philips
March 1	Stockholm	Sweden	Cirkus	Emo Philips
March 4	Düsseldorf	Germany	Capitol Theater	Emo Philips
March 5	Berlin	Germany	Admiralspalast	Emo Philips
March 6	Vienna	Austria	Vienna Gasometers	Emo Philips
March 10	Melbourne	Australia	Palais Theatre	Emo Philips
March 11	Melbourne	Australia	Palais Theatre	Emo Philips
March 13	Adelaide	Australia	Norwood Concert Hall	Emo Philips
March 14	Sydney	Australia	Enmore Theatre	Emo Philips
March 15	Sydney	Australia	Enmore Theatre	Emo Philips
March 18	Perth	Australia	Astor Theatre	Emo Philips
March 20	Brisbane	Australia	Queensland Performing Arts Centre	Emo Philips
March 21	Brisbane	Australia	Queensland Performing Arts Centre	Emo Philips
March 25	Honolulu	United States	Blaisdell Concert Hall	Jim West; Emo Philips
March 26	Kahului	United States	Castle Theater	Emo Philips
