= The Ridiculously Self-Indulgent, Ill-Advised Vanity Tour =

2018 concert tour by "Weird Al" Yankovic

- Tour by "Weird Al" Yankovic
- Promotional poster for the tour
- Start date: February 27, 2018
- End date: June 10, 2018
- Legs: 1
- No. of shows: 77
- Supporting act: Emo Philips

"Weird Al" Yankovic concert chronology
- The Mandatory World Tour (2015–2016); The Ridiculously Self-Indulgent, Ill-Advised Vanity Tour (2018); Strings Attached Tour (2019)

The Ridiculously Self-Indulgent, Ill-Advised Vanity Tour was a concert tour performed by American musician and satirist "Weird Al" Yankovic. Intended to be a more intimate and less stylized production compared to his previous concert tours, the Vanity Tour focused on Yankovic's older material and original songs. The 76-date North American tour was announced in October 2017, and included 68 shows in the United States and eight shows in Canada. Following the conclusion of the tour, recordings of the entire tour were released on Stitcher Premium.

== Background ==
In a departure from his previous concert tours, Yankovic set out on The Ridiculously Self-Indulgent, Ill-Advised Vanity Tour with the intention to produce a more intimate, less stylized show than his preceding concert tours, describing the Vanity Tour as having an "extremely limited appeal" by design, and inspired by the staging of VH1 Storytellers and MTV Unplugged. In a 2026 interview, Yankovic said that while putting on the fat suit he used for performing "Fat", he asked himself if he really needed to dress up on stage, and thought of doing a tour that focused on his music rather than spectacle. The absence of video screens and advanced lighting, along with the Vanity Tour's lack of his popular hits, costumes changes, props, and choreography present in Yankovic's previous tours allowed for a more flexible and unpredictable experience, to the testimonial approval of Yankovic himself and his touring band. In the tour's October 2017 announcement across social media, Yankovic stated:

By design, it has extremely limited appeal. Instead of doing festivals, fairs and arenas, we'll be doing small, intimate theatres. Instead of putting on a big flashy production, we'll be trying to go for something very informal and low-key… kind of an Unplugged/Storytellers vibe. Like we're just hanging out, playing in your living room. So if you've really got your heart set on seeing fat suits and Segways and hearing all your favorite parodies… this probably isn't the tour for you. Chances are we'll be doing that kind of show again sometime in the future, just not THIS time.

— "Weird Al" Yankovic

The opening act was the comedian Emo Philips, who had previously worked with Yankovic in his 1989 movie UHF and 1997 TV series The Weird Al Show.

In accordance with Yankovic's desired theme of more intimate and "loose" shows, the setlist for The Ridiculously Self-Indulgent, Ill-Advised Vanity Tour was different every night, with a focus on older material and original songs from his discography, as opposed to his staple parody songs. Yankovic performed a straight cover version of a different classic rock song during the encore of each show.

== Promotion ==
The Ridiculously Self-Indulgent, Ill-Advised Vanity Tour was officially announced on "Weird Al" Yankovic's official social media pages on 13 October 2017, with information on tour dates, venues and ticket sales appearing on Yankovic's official website the day after. Tickets for the Vanity Tour, which went on sale on October 20, were advertised from $50 to $70. The tour's announcement also coincided with the November 2017 release of Squeeze Box and Medium Rarities, two compilation albums collecting the works of Yankovic.

== Follow-up tour ==
In 2021 "Weird Al" Yankovic announced a follow-up concert tour to the Ridiculously Self-Indulgent, Ill-Advised Vanity Tour "The Unfortunate Return of the Ridiculously Self-Indulgent, Ill-Advised Vanity Tour", performed from May to October 2022 with special guest Emo Phillips.

I've loved doing every single incarnation of my live show, but honestly the Vanity tour is the most fun I've ever had on stage, so I've been dying to get back out there and torture everybody with it once again!

— "Weird Al" Yankovic

== Set list ==
Each of the 77 shows had a different set list, with the following 51 songs in regular rotation:

- "Airline Amy"
- "Albuquerque"
- "The Biggest Ball of Twine in Minnesota"
- "Bob"
- "Buy Me a Condo"
- "Christmas at Ground Zero"
- "Close But No Cigar"
- "CNR"
- "Craigslist"
- "Dare to Be Stupid" (Grateful Dead version)
- "Dog Eat Dog"
- "Don't Download This Song"
- "Fun Zone"
- "Generic Blues"
- "Good Enough For Now"
- "Good Old Days"
- "Happy Birthday"
- "I Remember Larry"
- "I Was Only Kidding"
- "I'll Sue Ya"
- "I'm So Sick of You"
- "If That Isn't Love"
- "Jackson Park Express"
- "Let Me Be Your Hog"
- "Melanie"
- "Midnight Star"
- "Mr. Frump in the Iron Lung"
- "Mr. Popeil"
- "My Baby's in Love With Eddie Vedder"
- "My Own Eyes"
- "Nature Trail to Hell"
- "The Night Santa Went Crazy"
- "One More Minute"
- "One of Those Days"
- "Party at the Leper Colony"
- "The Saga Begins"
- "She Never Told Me She Was a Mime"
- "Stop Forwarding That Crap to Me"
- "Stuck in a Closet With Vanna White"
- "That Boy Could Dance"
- "Traffic Jam"
- "Truck Drivin' Song"
- "UHF"
- "Velvet Elvis"
- "When I Was Your Age"
- "Why Does This Always Happen to Me?"
- "Yoda"
- "You Don’t Love Me Anymore"
- "Young, Dumb & Ugly"
- "Your Horoscope For Today"
- Unplugged Medley ("Eat It", "I Lost on Jeopardy", "Amish Paradise", "Smells Like Nirvana", "White & Nerdy", "I Love Rocky Road", "Like a Surgeon")

Encore Songs

- "Smoke on the Water"
- "Blue Suede Shoes"
- "I Saw Her Standing There"
- "Johnny B. Goode"
- "Do Wah Diddy Diddy"
- "Dirty Water"
- "Honky Tonk Women"
- "Tutti Frutti"
- "Wipeout"
- "All Day and All of the Night"
- "Should I Stay or Should I Go"
- "Blister in the Sun"
- "Uncontrollable Urge"
- "867-5309 (Jenny)"
- "Psycho Killer"
- "Hello There"
- "Refugee"
- "(They Long to Be) Close to You"
- "Cinnamon Girl"
- "Saturday Night's Alright for Fighting"
- "Play That Funky Music"
- "Free Bird"
- "China Grove"
- "Rebel Yell"
- "Stuck in the Middle with You"
- "Accordion Boogie"
- "Are You Gonna Be My Girl"
- "All Star"
- "Squeeze Box"
- "Beat on the Brat"
- "Last Train to Clarksville"
- "Beer Barrel Polka"
- "Breakdown"
- "What I Like About You"
- "We're an American Band"
- "Peaches"
- "It's Only Rock 'n Roll (But I Like It)"
- "Gimme Some Lovin'"
- "Glad All Over"
- "Sunshine of Your Love"
- "Particle Man"
- "Land of 1,000 Dances"
- "Crocodile Rock"
- "Viva Las Vegas"
- "Fire and Rain"
- "Werewolves of London"
- "I Wanna Be Sedated"
- "It's the End of the World as We Know It (And I Feel Fine)"
- "Born to Be Wild"
- "Vertigo"
- "You Really Got Me"
- "Sweet Home Alabama"
- "Suffragette City"
- "Mama Told Me (Not to Come)"
- "Radio Radio"
- "Girl U Want"
- "This Is a Call"
- "I'm Down"
- "The Elements"
- "Funeral For a Friend"
- "(You Make Me Feel Like) A Natural Woman"
- "God Save the Queen"
- "No Matter What"
- "Classical Gas"
- "Rock & Roll"
- "Funk #49"
- "Good Lovin'"
- "Foxy Lady"
- "Aqualung"
- "Hard to Handle"
- "All Right Now"
- "Summer Nights"
- "Magic Carpet Ride"
- "Rebel Rebel"
- "Takin' It to the Streets"
- "Not Fade Away"
- "School's Out"

== Tour dates ==
Date	City	Country	Venue	Opening Act
February 27, 2018	Poughkeepsie	United States	Bardavon 1869 Opera House	Emo Philips
March 1, 2018	Tarrytown	United States	Tarrytown Music Hall	Emo Philips
March 2, 2018	Ledyard	United States	Fox Theater	Emo Philips
March 3, 2018	Portsmouth	United States	The Music Hall	Emo Philips
March 4, 2018 (Matinee)	Boston	United States	Wilbur Theatre	Emo Philips
March 4, 2018 (Evening)	Boston	United States	Wilbur Theatre	Emo Philips
March 7, 2018	Montreal	Canada	Théâtre Maisonneuve	Emo Philips
March 8, 2018	Toronto	Canada	Danforth Music Hall	Emo Philips
March 9, 2018	Toronto	Canada	Danforth Music Hall	Emo Philips
March 10, 2018	Grand Rapids	United States	20 Monroe Live	Emo Philips
March 11, 2018	Ann Arbor	United States	Michigan Theater	Emo Philips
March 13, 2018	Amherst	United States	Mainstage Theatre	Emo Philips
March 14, 2018	Ithaca	United States	State Theater	Emo Philips
March 16, 2018	Atlantic City	United States	Circus Maximus Theater	Emo Philips
March 17, 2018	Huntington	United States	Paramount Theater	Emo Philips
March 18, 2018	Lancaster	United States	American Music Theatre	Emo Philips
March 20, 2018	North Bethesda	United States	The Music Center at Strathmore	Emo Philips
March 22, 2018	New York City	United States	Apollo Theater	Emo Philips
March 23, 2018	New York City	United States	Apollo Theater	Emo Philips
March 24, 2018	Greensburg	United States	Palace Theatre	Emo Philips
March 25, 2018	Cleveland	United States	Ohio Theatre	Emo Philips
March 26, 2018	Lexington	United States	Lexington Opera House	Emo Philips
March 28, 2018	Louisville	United States	Brown Theatre	Emo Philips
March 29, 2018	Carmel	United States	The Palladium	Emo Philips
March 30, 2018	Champaign	United States	Virginia Theatre	Emo Philips
March 31, 2018	Des Moines	United States	Hoyt Sherman Place Theater	Emo Philips
April 2, 2018	Rochester	United States	Mayo Civic Center Presentation Hall	Emo Philips
April 3, 2018	Minneapolis	United States	Pantages Theatre	Emo Philips
April 4, 2018	Minneapolis	United States	Pantages Theatre	Emo Philips
April 6, 2018	Chicago	United States	The Vic Theatre	Emo Philips
April 7, 2018	Chicago	United States	The Vic Theatre	Emo Philips
April 9, 2018	Milwaukee	United States	Pabst Theater	Emo Philips
April 10, 2018	Milwaukee	United States	Pabst Theater	Emo Philips
April 12, 2018	Wabash	United States	Ford Theater	Emo Philips
April 13, 2018	Chattanooga	United States	Walker Theater	Emo Philips
April 14, 2018	Augusta	United States	Miller Theater	Emo Philips
April 15, 2018	Atlanta	United States	Tabernacle	Emo Philips
April 17, 2018^{[A]}	Nashville	United States	War Memorial Auditorium	Emo Philips
April 19, 2018	Springfield	United States	Gillioz Theatre	Emo Philips
April 20, 2018	Longview	United States	Belcher Performance Center	Emo Philips
April 21, 2018^{[B]}	Austin	United States	Paramount Theatre	Emo Philips
April 22, 2018	Midland	United States	Wagner Noël Performing Arts Center	Emo Philips
April 24, 2018	Stafford	United States	Stafford Centre Performing Arts Theatre	Emo Philips
April 26, 2018	San Antonio	United States	H-E-B Performance Hall	Emo Philips
April 27, 2018	Dallas	United States	Majestic Theatre	Emo Philips
April 28, 2018	Wichita	United States	Orpheum Theatre	Emo Philips
April 29, 2018	Kansas City	United States	Folly Theater	Emo Philips
May 1, 2018	Denver	United States	Paramount Theatre	Emo Philips
May 3, 2018	Grand Junction	United States	Avalon Theatre	Emo Philips
May 4, 2018	Ivins	United States	Tuacahn Amphitheater	Emo Philips
May 5, 2018	Tucson	United States	Fox Tucson Theatre	Emo Philips
May 6, 2018	Santa Fe	United States	Lensic Theater	Emo Philips
May 8, 2018	Mesa	United States	Ikeda Theater	Emo Philips
May 9, 2018	Palm Desert	United States	McCallum Theatre	Emo Philips
May 10, 2018	Los Angeles	United States	The Theatre at Ace Hotel	Emo Philips
May 11, 2018	Los Angeles	United States	The Theatre at Ace Hotel	Emo Philips
May 12, 2018	San Diego	United States	Humphreys Concerts By the Bay	Emo Philips
May 15, 2018	Sacramento	United States	Crest Theatre	Emo Philips
May 17, 2018	Monterey	United States	Golden State Theatre	Emo Philips
May 18, 2018	Turlock	United States	Turlock Community Theatre	Emo Philips
May 19, 2018	Oakland	United States	Fox Oakland Theatre	Emo Philips
May 20, 2018	Napa	United States	Uptown Theater	Emo Philips
May 22, 2018	Redding	United States	Cascade Theatre	Emo Philips
May 24, 2018	Eugene	United States	McDonald Theatre	Emo Philips
May 25, 2018	Portland	United States	Revolution Hall	Emo Philips
May 26, 2018	Portland	United States	Revolution Hall	Emo Philips
May 27, 2018	Spokane	United States	Woldson Theater	Emo Philips
May 29, 2018	Seattle	United States	Moore Theatre	Emo Philips
May 31, 2018	Calgary	Canada	Grey Eagle Event Centre	Emo Philips
June 1, 2018	Regina	Canada	Casino Regina Show Lounge	Emo Philips
June 2, 2018	Edmonton	Canada	River Cree Entertainment Centre	Emo Philips
June 3, 2018	Medicine Hat	Canada	Esplanade Theatre	Emo Philips
June 5, 2018	Winnipeg	Canada	Burton Cummings Theatre	Emo Philips
June 6, 2018	Fargo	United States	Fargo Theatre	Emo Philips
June 8, 2018	Columbia	United States	Jesse Auditorium	Emo Philips
June 9, 2018	Clear Lake	United States	Surf Ballroom	Emo Philips
June 10, 2018	Green Bay	United States	Meyer Theatre	Emo Philips

Festivals and other miscellaneous performances
^{A} This concert was a part of the "Nashville Comedy Festival"
^{B} This concert was a part of the "Moontower Comedy Festival"

=== Box office score data ===
Venue	City	Tickets sold / Available	Gross revenue
Théâtre Maisonneuve	Montreal	2,102 / 2,102 (100%)	$98,975
Circus Maximus Theater	Atlantic City	1,330 / 1,606 (83%)	$81,258
Ohio Theatre	Cleveland	932 / 1,000 (93%)	$63,019
Pantages Theatre	Minneapolis	1,968 / 1,980 (99%)	$124,124
The Vic Theatre	Chicago	1,879 / 1,879 (100%)	$94,231
Wagner Noël Performing Arts Center	Midland	984 / 1,733 (57%)	$42,690
The Theatre at Ace Hotel	Los Angeles	2,981 / 2,981 (100%)	$206,726
Crest Theatre	Sacramento	934 / 975 (96%)	$54,538
Fox Oakland Theatre	Oakland	1,923 / 1,923 (100%)	$117,345
TOTAL		15,033 / 16,179 (93%)	$882,906
