= Addicted to Love (song) =

1986 single by Robert Palmer

- Picture sleeve for UK and European editions of the single (photographer, Peter Ashworth)

Single by Robert Palmer

from the album Riptide
- B-side: "Remember to Remember"
- Released: January 1986
- Genre: Rock
- Length: 6:03 (album version); 4:04 (single version)
- Label: Island
- Songwriter: Robert Palmer
- Producer: Bernard Edwards

Robert Palmer singles chronology
"Riptide" (1986)	"Addicted to Love" (1986)	"Hyperactive" (1986)

Music video
- "Addicted to Love" on YouTube

"Addicted to Love" is a song by the English rock singer Robert Palmer released in 1986. It is the third song on Palmer's eighth studio album Riptide (1985) and was released as its third single. The single version is a shorter edit of the full-length album version.

The song entered the US Billboard Hot 100 chart the week ending 8 February 1986. The song topped the Billboard Hot 100, as well as the Billboard Top Rock Tracks chart, and it received a gold certification for shipping half a million copies in the United States. It also reached number one in Australia and number five on the UK Singles Chart. "Addicted to Love" became Palmer's signature song, thanks in huge part to a popular video featuring high-fashion models.

== Background ==
Originally recorded as a duet with Chaka Khan, her vocals were erased and the song was released without her because her record company at the time would not grant her a release to work on Palmer's label, Island Records. Chaka Khan is still credited for the vocal arrangements in the album liner notes.

Most guitar parts, including the solo, were played by Eddie Martinez. Andy Taylor of Duran Duran (and a bandmate of Palmer's from the Power Station) added rhythm guitar. Keyboards were played by Wally Badarou. As well as producing the song, Bernard Edwards played the bass. The song's drum intro is by Tony Thompson, another Power Station alumnus.

== Music video ==
The music video (which uses the shorter single version of this song), directed by English photographer Terence Donovan, was one of the most noted of the era. The video features Palmer performing the song with an abstract "band", a group of female models whose pale skin, heavy makeup, dark hair, and seductive, rather mannequin-like expression follow the style of women in Patrick Nagel paintings.

The five models in the video are Julie Pankhurst (keyboard), Patty Kelly (guitar), Mak Gilchrist (bass guitar), Julia Bolino (guitar), and Kathy Davies (drums).

Mak Gilchrist recalled to Q:

I was 21 and got the part on the strength of my modelling book. We were meant to look and "act" like showroom mannequins. Director Terence Donovan got us tipsy on a bottle of wine but as we were having our make-up retouched, I lost balance on my heels and knocked the top of my guitar into the back of Robert's head, and his face then hit the microphone.

In a 2013 interview, when asked why she was designated the drummer and not given a close-up shot, Kathy Davies jokingly replied, "I guess the naughty ones always get sent to the back." Davies added that she did not mind it because she thought Palmer "had a good bum." Palmer recycled the video's models concept for the videos of three other songs of his: "I Didn't Mean to Turn You On" (also from Riptide), "Simply Irresistible", and the animated "Change His Ways" (both from Heavy Nova).

VH1's Pop-Up Video trivia about the video include the fact that a musician was hired to teach the models basic fingering techniques, but "gave up after about an hour and left." The episode also pointed out several choreographic errors, including the models moving out of sync with one another, and moving during points with no back beat, such as the second chorus.

The music video ranked at number 3 on VH1's Top 20 Videos of the 1980s and was the last video shown on long running UK music programme The Chart Show.

In the romantic comedy film Love Actually (2003), written and directed by Richard Curtis, the video for Billy Mack's song, "Christmas Is All Around" (a Christmas music parody of "Love Is All Around"), is a tribute to "Addicted to Love". The "Addicted to Love" models' blank expression is parodied in the "Christmas Is All Around" video, with the latter's models visibly bored to the point of yawning.

The models were also used in the spoof of the video in "Weird Al" Yankovic's UHF wearing glasses and moustaches. The music video was parodied in the videos of Stardust's "Music Sounds Better with You", Tone Lōc's "Wild Thing", Mr Blobby's "Mr Blobby", Bowling for Soup's "1985", Shania Twain's "Man! I Feel Like a Woman!", Shakira's "Las de la Intuición", Kasey Chambers's "If I Were You", Paula Abdul's "Forever Your Girl", Die Prinzen's "Alles nur geklaut", and Luca Carboni's "Luca lo stesso".

== Track listing ==
7-inch vinyl single – US (Island Records – 7-99570)
No.	Title	Writer(s)	Length
1.	"Addicted to Love"	Robert Palmer	3:59
2.	"Let's Fall in Love Tonight"	Alan Thompson	4:02

CD single – Japan
No.	Title	Writer(s)	Length
1.	"Addicted to Love (12" version)"	Robert Palmer	5:02
2.	"Remember to Remember"	Robert Palmer	3:33
3.	"You Are in My System (remix)"	David Frank; Mic Murphy	6:05

== Charts ==
=== Weekly charts ===
Chart (1986)	Peak position
Australia (Kent Music Report)	1
Belgium (Ultratop 50 Flanders)	34
Canada (The Record)	7
Canada Top Singles (RPM)	4
Europe (European Hot 100 Singles)	28
Ireland (IRMA)	4
Netherlands (Dutch Top 40)	34
Netherlands (Single Top 100)	34
New Zealand (Recorded Music NZ)	2
South Africa (Springbok Radio)	4
UK Singles (Official Charts)	5
US Billboard Hot 100	1
US Dance/Disco Club Play (Billboard)	36
US Top Rock Tracks (Billboard)	1
US Cash Box Top 100	1

Chart (2003)	Peak position
UK Singles (Official Charts)	42

=== Year-end charts ===
Chart (1986)	Rank
Australia (Kent Music Report)	10
Canada Top Singles (RPM)	36
New Zealand (RIANZ)	22
UK Singles (OCC)	61
US Billboard Hot 100	10
US Album Rock Tracks (Billboard)	20
US Cash Box Top 100	11

== Certifications ==
Region	Certification	Certified units/sales
United Kingdom (BPI)	Gold	400,000^{‡}
United States (RIAA)	Gold	500,000^{^}
^{^} Shipments figures based on certification alone.^{‡} Sales+streaming figures based on certification alone.

== Tina Turner version ==
"Addicted to Love" (live)

Single by Tina Turner

from the album Tina Live in Europe
- B-side: "Overnight Sensation" (live); "Legs" (live)
- Released: March 7, 1988
- Length: 5:10 (single mix)
- Label: Capitol
- Songwriter: Robert Palmer
- Producer: John Hudson

Tina Turner singles chronology
"Nutbush City Limits" (live) (1988)	"Addicted to Love" (live) (1988)	"Tonight" (live) (1988)

American singer Tina Turner made "Addicted to Love" a regular feature of her live shows from 1986, although her version did not make it onto the market until two years later.

A live recording from the 1986/1987 Break Every Rule Tour of the track was included on her Tina: Live in Europe album in 1988, and was also issued as the lead single to promote the album in certain territories (instead of "Nutbush City Limits") and was a Top 20 hit in the Netherlands.

The two singles had the same B-sides: live recordings of "Overnight Sensation" and ZZ Top's "Legs" and near identical picture sleeves. The version of "Addicted to Love" issued on the single was in fact an alternate mix of the track; the single mix was later included on the European editions of her 1991 greatest hits album Simply the Best, as well as All the Best in 2004, Tina! in 2008 and Queen of Rock'n Roll in 2023. Another live version was included in Tina Live in 2009.

=== Official versions ===
- Tina Live in Europe album mix – 5:22
- Single Mix – 5:10
- Tina Live – 4:54

=== Charts ===
Chart (1988)	Peak position
Belgium (Ultratop 50 Flanders)	23
Netherlands (Dutch Top 40)	19
Netherlands (Single Top 100)	28
UK Singles (Official Charts)	71

== See also ==
- List of number-one singles in Australia during the 1980s
- List of Billboard Hot 100 number ones of 1986
- List of Cash Box Top 100 number-one singles of 1986
- List of Billboard Mainstream Rock number-one songs of the 1980s
- Addicted to Spuds
