= Honey (Robert Palmer album) =

Studio album by Robert Palmer
- Released: 12 September 1994
- Studio: Logic (Milan)
- Genres: Blue-eyed soul; funk; hard rock; worldbeat
- Length: 47:43
- Label: EMI
- Producers: Robert Palmer; Stephen Hague

Robert Palmer chronology
Ridin' High (1992)	Honey (1994)	The Very Best of Robert Palmer (1995)

Singles from Honey
- 1. "Girl U Want" Released: 27 June 1994; 2. "Know by Now" Released: 22 August 1994; 3. "You Blow Me Away" Released: 28 November 1994

Honey is the twelfth studio album by the English singer Robert Palmer, released in September 1994 by EMI Records. It reached number 25 in the UK Albums Chart and includes the minor hit singles "Girl U Want", "Know by Now" and "You Blow Me Away". "Girl U Want" is a cover of a single by American new wave band Devo.

== Critical reception ==
Professional ratings
Review scores
Source	Rating
AllMusic	3/5 stars
Cash Box	(positive)
Entertainment Weekly	B+
Get Ready to Rock!	3/5 stars
Music & Media	(positive)
Music Week	3/5 stars
People	(positive)
Super Deluxe Edition	(negative)

Upon release, pan-European magazine Music & Media noted: "Right when you've written off the eternal nobleman as a lost crooner, he returns with a vengeance. Surrounded by ambitious musicians, Palmer has provided his most inspired album in years." People described the album as a "stunning follow-up to 1992's Ridin' High" and commented: "Through it all, Honey goes down smoothly—and Palmer proves once again that he's simply irresistible." Cash Box commented: "Robert Palmer has been making music for over two decades. His new album reflects his experience like a well-aged bottle of wine, graceful and dignified. The most impressive aspect of the record is the versatility he displays."

David Hiltbrand of Entertainment Weekly stated: "The British singer mostly plays to his strong suits: suave, double-breasted vocals, unconventional but funky rhythms, and exotic Afro-Carib musical flourishes. It all fuses on "Know by Now," the sort of bittersweet up-tempo ballad at which Palmer excels. Later on he indulges in some empty hard-rock posturing abetted by Extreme's Nuno Bettencourt. But at least Palmer steers clear of the stuffy piano-lounge standards that have marred so many of his recent releases."

In a retrospective review, Leslie Mathew of AllMusic said: "...Palmer himself sounds as inhumanly suave as ever, though much of the material is a prescription for déjà vu. Ironically, given its title, this album is much more hard-edged than Heavy Nova and Riptide. Highlights include "Know By Now," a tasty mid-paced rocker, and "Nobody But You," a twitchy, coiled funk ditty. Honey has its moments, and plenty to spare, but it also occasionally gives the impression of a man who's trying too hard."

Paul Sinclair of Super Deluxe Edition said: "Honey returns to contemporary rock/pop with a typically varied selection of songs. It doesn't really match the standards of the previous records. Singles "Know By Now" and especially "You Blow Me Away" are both strong but feel slightly let down by the production, which for the time comes across as a little cheesy and bombastic in places. Overall, rather inessential." Get Ready to Rock! wrote: "Honey saw him back exploring an eclectic mix of World music, funk, jazz, rock/pop and dance. But once again the constant switching of styles is somewhat unsettling."

== Track listing ==
All tracks are written by Robert Palmer, except "Love Takes Time" by Palmer, Mary Ambrose and Sharon O'Neill, and "Girl U Want" by Mark Mothersbaugh and Gerald V. Casale.

No.	Title	Length
1.	"Honey A"	1:35
2.	"Honey B"	4:03
3.	"You're Mine"	4:13
4.	"Know by Now"	4:10
5.	"Nobody But You"	3:53
6.	"Love Takes Time"	5:02
7.	"Honeymoon"	2:16
8.	"You Blow Me Away"	4:32
9.	"Close to the Edge"	2:27
10.	"Closer to the Edge"	2:41
11.	"Girl U Want"	2:22
12.	"Wham Bam Boogie"	3:15
13.	"Big Trouble"	3:56
14.	"Dreams Come True"	3:11

== Personnel ==
- Robert Palmer – vocals, arrangements
- Alan Mansfield – keyboards, soprano saxophone
- Nuno Bettencourt – guitars
- Gary Butcher – guitars
- Saverio Porciello – guitars
- Frank Blair – bass
- Andy Duncan – drums, percussion
- Mauro Spina – drums, percussion
- Dony Wynn – drums
- Jose Rossy – percussion
- Demo Morselli – trumpet, flugelhorn
- Sharon O'Neill – additional vocals

=== Production ===
- Robert Palmer – producer
- Stephen Hague – producer, remix (tracks 4, 6, 8)
- Teo Macero – additional production
- David Harper – executive producer
- Richard Coble – production coordinator
- Pino "Pinaxa" Pischetola – recording, mixing
- Chris Lord-Alge – remix (track 3)
- Mike "Spike" Drake – remix (tracks 4, 6, 8)
- Antonio Baglio – mastering

Additional credits

- Bill Smith Studio – design, artwork
- Robert Palmer – design concept, handwriting
- Nigel Perry – photography
- Alan Hydes – original oil painting

Studios

- Recorded and mixed at Logic Studios (Milan, Italy)
- Mastered at Profile Studio (Milan, Italy)

== Charts ==
Chart (1994)	Peak position
Dutch Albums (Album Top 100)	85
German Albums (Offizielle Top 100)	76
UK Albums (OCC)	25
