= Know by Now =

1994 single by Robert Palmer

Single by Robert Palmer

from the album Honey
- B-side: "In the Stars"
- Released: 22 August 1994
- Genre: Pop rock
- Length: 4:11 (album version); 4:01 (single version)
- Label: EMI United Kingdom
- Songwriter: Robert Palmer
- Producers: Robert Palmer; Stephen Hague

Robert Palmer singles chronology
"Girl U Want" (1994)	"Know by Now" (1994)	"You Blow Me Away" (1994)

Audio video
- "Know by Now" (album version) on YouTube

"Know by Now" is a song by English singer-songwriter Robert Palmer, released in August 1994 by EMI Records as the second single from the singer's twelfth studio album, Honey (1994). The song was written by Palmer and co-produced by Palmer alongside Stephen Hague. "Know by Now" reached number 25 in the UK Singles Chart and remained in the top 100 for five weeks. The accompanying music video was directed by Russell Young and shot in Barcelona, Spain.

== Background ==
Speaking to The Canadian Press in 1994, Palmer said of the song, "I happen to think that it is probably the best song I've written for many reasons – first of all, it's three songs in one, in that each piece of it was a separate inspiration at a different time, not merely a reason to get from A to C."

== Critical reception ==
Upon its release as a single, Andrew Hirst of the Huddersfield Daily Examiner named it the "single of the week" and wrote, "Every now and then Palmer releases a single of quality and distinction. This is another one." In the US, Larry Flick of Billboard magazine described the song as "a breezy pop/rocker" and added, "His distinctive delivery glides with friendly ease and warmth over an arrangement of plucky guitar lines and a steady, synth-coated beat. He brings colors and tones to this track that haven't turned up on one of his records in years – what a pleasure. A toe-tapper that sticks to the brain after one spin."

Pan-European magazine Music & Media wrote, "Still sweaty from the two-minute rocker 'Girl U Want', Palmer has adapted his gentleman pose again with an elegant ballad to match his position. May radio be his servile butler." In the review for the album Honey, Leslie Mathew of AllMusic commented: "Highlights include 'Know by Now', a tasty mid-paced rocker." CD Review said: "In a classier vein 'Know by Now' reworks that percolating 'Every Breath You Take' groove one more time." In the 1997 book The Virgin Encyclopedia of Seventies Music, Colin Larkin commented: "Honey was another credible release with notable tracks such as 'Know by Now' and the title song."

== Music video ==
The music video for "Know by Now" was directed by Russell Young and filmed on location in Barcelona, Spain. Joe Dyer directed photography and Joseph Uliano produced the video.

== Track listings ==
- 7-inch single
1. "Know by Now" (radio edit) – 4:01
2. "Mercy, Mercy Me" / "I Want You" – 5:58
- CD single (UK CD1)
1. "Know by Now" (radio edit) – 4:01
2. "In the Stars" – 4:51
3. "Simply Irresistible" – 4:14
4. "Mercy, Mercy Me" / "I Want You" – 5:58
- CD single (Europe; UK CD2)
1. "Know by Now" (radio edit) – 4:01
2. "In the Stars" – 4:51
3. "Know by Now" (Pinaxa mix) – 5:26
4. "She Makes My Day" – 4:15
- CD single (Australia)
1. "Know by Now" (radio edit) – 4:01
2. "In the Stars" – 4:51
3. "Know by Now" (Pinaxa mix) – 5:26
4. "She Makes My Day" – 4:15
5. "Girl U Want" – 2:24

== Personnel ==
Production

- Robert Palmer – producer, arranger
- Stephen Hague – producer
- Pino "Pinaxa" Pischetola – mixing, remixer of "Pinaxa Mix"

== Charts ==
Chart (1994)	Peak position
Belgium (Ultratop 50 Flanders)	38
Canada Top Singles (RPM)	23
Canada Adult Contemporary (RPM)	18
Europe (European AC Radio)	7
Europe (European Hit Radio)	7
Germany (Official German Charts)	51
Iceland (Íslenski Listinn Topp 40)	31
UK Singles (OCC)	25
UK Airplay (Music Week)	6

== Release history ==
Region	Date	Format(s)	Label(s)	Ref.
United Kingdom	22 August 1994	7-inch vinyl; CD; cassette	EMI United Kingdom	
Australia	14 November 1994	CD; cassette	EMI	
