= Greatest Hits Volume II ("Weird Al" Yankovic album) =

Greatest hits album by "Weird Al" Yankovic
- Released: October 25, 1994
- Recorded: 1984–1994
- Genre: Comedy
- Length: 43:32
- Label: Scotti Brothers

"Weird Al" Yankovic chronology
Permanent Record: Al in the Box (1994)	Greatest Hits Volume II (1994)	The TV Album (1995)

Greatest Hits Volume II is a greatest hits album of songs by "Weird Al" Yankovic, released on October 25, 1994. The album, released by Scotti Brothers Records, features his best known songs that did not appear on "Weird Al" Yankovic's Greatest Hits, plus the new single "Headline News" which had first appeared on the box set Permanent Record: Al In The Box, released a month prior. The album received mostly positive reviews from music critics, and it charted on the Billboard 200 at number 198. However, it ranks among Yankovic's least-selling records.

== Production ==
=== Music ===
The music featured on the album spans a decade, with the earliest songs being recorded in 1985 and the most recent song being recorded in 1994. Yankovic's third album, Dare to Be Stupid has two songs featured: "This is the Life" and "Yoda". Christmas at Ground Zero first appeared on the 1986 release Polka Party!. "Money for Nothing/Beverly Hillbillies*" was culled from the 1989 album UHF – Original Motion Picture Soundtrack and Other Stuff. "Smells Like Nirvana", "Polka Your Eyes Out", and "You Don't Love Me Anymore" were taken from Yankovic's 1992 album Off the Deep End. Finally, "Achy Breaky Song" and "Jurassic Park" first appeared on the 1993 record Alapalooza.

The album also includes "Headline News", which had previously appeared on Permanent Record: Al in the Box; the single had been recorded and released specifically for the box set, but Yankovic also insisted it be available as a commercial single so his fans would not have to purchase something they usually would not be able to afford. The single edit of "UHF" is included on this disc, as opposed to the six-minute version available on UHF – Original Motion Picture Soundtrack and Other Stuff; this was done because Yankovic figured that "fans would appreciate having both versions available".

== Reception ==
=== Critical response ===
Professional ratings
Review scores
Source	Rating
AllMusic	4.5/5 stars
The Encyclopedia of Popular Music	3/5 stars
The Rolling Stone Album Guide	3.5/5 stars

Roch Parisien of AllMusic noted, "Sure, he can be corny, but when "Weird Al" Yankovic hits the target, he can also be one pointed satirist." He highlighted "Smells Like Nirvana", "Headline News", and "Jurassic Park" as stand-outs, calling them "rib-ticklers". Nathan Brackett and Christian Hoard, in The Rolling Stone Album Guide, awarded the album three-and-a-half stars out of five, denoting that the album averaged between good and excellent.

=== Commercial performance ===
The album was released on October 25, 1994, about a month after the release of the previous compilation, Permanent Record: Al in the Box. Upon its release, it charted and peaked at number 198 on the Billboard 200, making it his first compilation album to chart. In January 1997, the album was one of Yankovic's lowest-selling records, although it ranked above several other albums such as The Food Album, the soundtrack album to his 1989 film "UHF", The TV Album, and the Permanent Record box set in terms of sales.

== Track listing ==
1. "Headline News" (orig. Brad Roberts, arr. Yankovic) – 3:46
  - Parody of "Mmm Mmm Mmm Mmm" by Crash Test Dummies; details three major tabloid stories of 1993–4. This single was recorded for the previously released compilation, Permanent Record: Al in the Box.
2. "Bedrock Anthem" (orig. Anthony Kiedis, John Frusciante, Flea, Chad Smith, arr. Yankovic) – 3:43
  - Parody of "Under the Bridge" and "Give It Away" by the Red Hot Chili Peppers; discusses someone who wants to be a Flintstone and live in Bedrock. From the 1993 album Alapalooza.
3. "You Don't Love Me Anymore" (Yankovic) – 4:00
  - Original; a ballad addressed to an ex-girlfriend who did numerous exaggerated and deadly things to the singer and his obliviousness to their meaning. From the 1992 album Off the Deep End.
4. "Smells Like Nirvana" (orig. Kurt Cobain, Dave Grohl, Krist Novoselic, arr. "Weird Al" Yankovic) – 3:42
  - Parody of "Smells Like Teen Spirit" by Nirvana; the song pokes fun at the original song's ambiguous and unintelligible lyrics. From the 1992 album Off the Deep End.
5. "Achy Breaky Song" (orig. Don Von Tress, arr. Yankovic) – 3:23
  - Parody of "Achy Breaky Heart" by Billy Ray Cyrus; the singer begs not to have to listen to the original song. From the 1993 album Alapalooza.
6. "UHF" (Yankovic) – 3:49
  - Original; theme song to Yankovic's 1989 film UHF. The single edit had previously appeared on the Permanent Record: Al in the Box.
7. "Money for Nothing/Beverly Hillbillies" (Mark Knopfler, Gordon Sumner, Paul Henning, arr. "Weird Al" Yankovic) – 3:11
  - Parody of "Money for Nothing" by Dire Straits; the song features the slightly altered lyrics of the theme song from the television series The Beverly Hillbillies which are set to the tune of Dire Straits' single. From the 1989 album and soundtrack UHF – Original Motion Picture Soundtrack and Other Stuff.
8. "Jurassic Park" (orig. Jimmy Webb, arr. "Weird Al" Yankovic) – 3:55
  - Parody of "MacArthur Park" by Richard Harris; recounts the plot to the movie Jurassic Park. From the 1993 album Alapalooza.
9. "This Is the Life" (Yankovic) – 3:06
  - Style parody of 1920s and 1930s music; the singer brags about his lavish lifestyle. From the 1985 album Dare to Be Stupid.
10. "Polka Your Eyes Out" (Polka medley, arr. Yankovic) – 3:50
  - A polka medley including songs popular from 1990 to 1992. From the 1992 album Off the Deep End.
11. "Yoda" (orig. Ray Davies, arr. Yankovic) – 3:58
  - Parody of "Lola" by The Kinks; describes the Dagobah-setting events of The Empire Strikes Back as told from the point of view of Luke Skywalker. From the 1985 album Dare to Be Stupid.
12. "Christmas at Ground Zero" (Yankovic) – 3:09
  - Style parody of Christmas carols, arranged in the style of Phil Spector's Wall of Sound; an apocalyptic song set to a cheerful Yuletide tune. From the 1986 album Polka Party!.

== Charts ==
Chart performance
Chart (1994)	Peak position
US Billboard 200	198
