= You Blow Me Away =

Single by Robert Palmer

from the album Honey
- B-side: "No Control"
- Released: 28 November 1994
- Genre: Pop rock
- Length: 4:35
- Label: EMI
- Songwriter: Robert Palmer
- Producers: Stephen Hague, Robert Palmer

Robert Palmer singles chronology
"Know by Now" (1994)	"You Blow Me Away" (1994)	"Respect Yourself" (1995)

Audio video
- "You Blow Me Away" on YouTube

"You Blow Me Away" is a song by English vocalist Robert Palmer, which was released in 1994 as the third and final single from his twelfth studio album Honey. The song was written solely by Palmer, and produced by Stephen Hague and Palmer.

== Background ==
Released as the third and final single from the Honey album, "You Blow Me Away" was a moderate commercial success in the UK, but not as successful as the previous single "Know by Now". It peaked at No. 38 and remained in the charts for four weeks. It would be Palmer's last Top 40 entry in the charts.

== Release ==
The single was released on 7" vinyl, cassette and CD in the UK only. The B-side was Palmer's 1988 hit "Simply Irresistible".

Two CD versions were released in the UK as part of a 2-part set. The first CD of the set featured the non-album track "No Control", a "Karaoke Mix" of "You Blow Me Away" and a remixed version of "Know by Now". The second CD featured a "Remix Edit" and "Alge Mix" of "You Blow Me Away", along with the track "Change His Ways" from Palmer's 1988 album Heavy Nova. The remixes were handled by either Pino "Pinaxa" Pischetola or Chris Lord Alge. A promotional CD single was also released in the UK, featuring "You Blow Me Away" as the only track.

== Promotion ==
Two music videos were recorded to promote the single, as Palmer wasn't happy with the first one. Palmer also performed the song at the 1994 German RSH-Gold ceremony, which was broadcast on RTL 2.

== Critical reception ==
In a 1994 review of Honey by CD Review, the writer commented: "...the epic ballad "You Blow Me Away" epitomizes excess and works beautifully, with Palmer abandoning his reserve for a delightfully corny ode to romance." Cash Box described the song as "scaled-down soul". In a retrospective review of Honey, Super Deluxe Edition said: "Singles "Know By Now" and especially "You Blow Me Away" are both strong but feel slightly let down by the production, which for the time comes across as a little cheesy and bombastic in places."

== Track listing ==
7" Single

No.	Title	Length
1.	"You Blow Me Away"	4:35
2.	"Simply Irresistible"	5:58

CD Single (UK #1)

No.	Title	Length
1.	"You Blow Me Away"	4:35
2.	"No Control"	4:09
3.	"You Blow Me Away (Karaoke Mix)"	4:36
4.	"Know by Now"	4:01

CD Single (UK #2)

No.	Title	Length
1.	"You Blow Me Away"	4:35
2.	"You Blow Me Away (Remix Edit)"	4:16
3.	"You Blow Me Away (Alge Mix)"	4:36
4.	"Change His Ways"	2:56

CD Single (Promotional release)

No.	Title	Length
1.	"You Blow Me Away"	4:35

== Personnel ==
- Robert Palmer – vocals, producer, arranger
- Stephen Hague – producer on "You Blow Me Away", remixing of "Know By Now"
- Teo Macero – additional producer on "Know By Now"
- Mike "Spike" Drake – remixing of "Know By Now"
- David Harper – executive producer
- Eric "E.T." Thorngren – remixing on "Change His Ways"
- Pino "Pinaxa" Pischetola – mixing on "No Control", remixer of "You Blow Me Away (Remix Edit)", constructor, recorder, mixer of "Know by Now"
- Chris Lord Alge – remixer of "You Blow Me Away (Alge Mix)

== Charts ==
Chart (1994)	Peak position
UK Singles Chart	38
UK Airplay (Music Week)	31
