= Headline News ("Weird Al" Yankovic song) =

1994 single by "Weird Al" Yankovic

Single by "Weird Al" Yankovic

from the album Permanent Record: Al in the Box
- B-side: "Christmas at Ground Zero" (alternate mix)
- Released: September 27, 1994
- Recorded: July 27, 1994
- Length: 3:46
- Label: Rock 'n Roll; Scotti Brothers
- Songwriters: Brad Roberts; Al Yankovic
- Producer: "Weird Al" Yankovic

"Weird Al" Yankovic singles chronology
"Achy Breaky Song" (1993)	"Headline News" (1994)	"Amish Paradise" (1996)

Music video
- "Headline News" on YouTube

"Headline News" is a parody song by "Weird Al" Yankovic. It is a parody of the Crash Test Dummies' 1993 hit "Mmm Mmm Mmm Mmm". It was released as the lead-off single for the compilation box set Permanent Record: Al in the Box on September 27, 1994. The song was written after Yankovic's label insisted he craft a new song to promote the album; Yankovic in turn combined the music of the Crash Test Dummies' song with three news stories that were popular in late 1993 and early 1994.

To help promote the song and album, Yankovic directed a music video that was a direct parody of the Crash Test Dummies' original. In it, the three news stories are presented as if they are one-act plays to an audience. The song's video took two days to film and ended up running over the allotted time that had been scheduled for production, costing the record label a considerable amount of money. Several notable individuals made cameos in the video, including Doug Llewelyn, Dr. Demento, and Judy Tenuta.

The song and video were met with mostly positive reviews from critics, although at least one critic for The Commercial Appeal felt that the source material was already dated upon the single's release. Crash Test Dummies themselves were pleased with the final result and even performed the song with Yankovic in concert twice. "Headline News" charted at number four on the Billboard Bubbling Under Hot 100 Singles chart, making it Yankovic's first single to chart domestically since 1992's "Smells Like Nirvana".

== Writing ==
While Yankovic was writing the original songs for a new album—which was later released in 1996 as Bad Hair Day—his label, Scotti Brothers Records, insisted that he release a new record in order to meet monetary projections for the fourth fiscal quarter of the year. Yankovic, however, explained that he would be unable to finish a new record in time, so his label decided to release a box set entitled Permanent Record: Al in the Box. The label then stipulated that Yankovic would need to at least record a new single to promote the box set.

Due to this demand, Yankovic nearly had Scotti Brothers cancel the box set due to being unable to write under pressure before turning to the Crash Test Dummies' recent hit "Mmm Mmm Mmm Mmm". Yankovic had heard the song earlier in the year and, at the time, believed that it had the potential to be parodied on his next studio album. However, after Scotti Brothers insisted that he record a new song to promote Permanent Record, Yankovic decided to feature a Crash Test Dummies parody as the set's lead single. Yankovic later realized that by releasing "Headline News" on the Permanent Record set rather than wait to include it on his next album, he could capitalize on the topicality of the parody's lyrics.

While each verse of "Mmm Mmm Mmm Mmm" told the story of a different abnormal child, the verses in "Headline News" recount three famous tabloid stories of 1993 and 1994: the American vandal Michael Fay being caned in Singapore, figure skater Tonya Harding's ex-husband attacking her rival Nancy Kerrigan, and Lorena Bobbitt severing her husband's penis with a knife. (When singing about the latter story, Yankovic substitutes the term "penis" with euphemisms like "wiener" and "Mr. Happy".) Yankovic later joked that he "wanted to write a song about these people because he didn't think they're getting quite enough media attention"—a reference to the stories' over-saturation in the news.

== Recording ==
"Headline News" (sample)
"Headline News", from Yankovic's 1994 compilation album Permanent Record: Al in the Box. The sample illustrates Yankovic's parody, including the musical re-creation of the original song, along with the various elements added, such as manualism, accordion, and kazoos.

Recording for the song began on July 27, 1994, at Santa Monica Sound Recorders in Santa Monica, California. Yankovic himself produced the song. Backing Yankovic were Jon "Bermuda" Schwartz on drums, Steve Jay on bass, Jim West on guitar, and Kim Bullard on keyboards. Lisa Popeil provides the female backup vocals, as well as the scream of Nancy Kerrigan. The song also features idiosyncratic sonic elements to increase the humor, such as: manualist sound effects courtesy of Mike Kieffer; a chorus of kazoos, which joins in during the song's outro; and Yankovic playing a short riff on his trademark instrument, the accordion. Due to the vocal parts of the original song being in such a low register, Yankovic had to record the parody's vocal tracks early in the morning, when his voice was naturally lower.

== Music video ==
The music video for "Headline News" parodies the "Mmm Mmm Mmm Mmm" video in that it presents each news story as a one-act play on stage before an audience of people. The video was directed by Yankovic, making it his third directoral credit after 1986's "Christmas at Ground Zero" and 1993's "Bedrock Anthem". Yankovic appears as Brad Roberts, and his band appears as the other members of the Crash Test Dummies; notably, the video also marks the on-screen debut of Yankovic's official keyboardist, Rubén Valtierra, who appears in drag as Ellen Reid. The video was filmed on August 29 and 31, 1994. All of the scenes that took place at the school were filmed during the day at Longfellow Elementary School Auditorium, in Pasadena, California. The scenes at the ice rink were filmed at night in a rink in Paramount, California. According to Yankovic, the crew ran over time and it was a rather expensive video. Yankovic noted that "without giving you the actual number", he could have "recorded two albums, probably, for what it cost to do that one video." The video features several celebrity cameos, including an appearance by Doug Llewelyn of People's Court fame, and long time radio show host Dr. Demento. Comedian Judy Tenuta also appears as Lorena Bobbitt. The cast also includes Danny Fehsenfeld as Michael Fay, Laura Pursell as Tonya Harding, Maria Causey-Nelson as Nancy Kerrigan, and Sal Rendino as John Bobbitt.

== Release ==
=== Reception ===
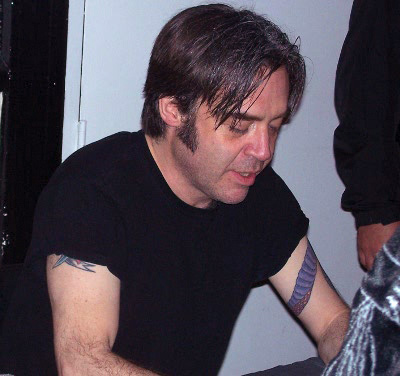
Brad Roberts, writer of "Mmm Mmm Mmm Mmm", enjoyed the parody and has performed it in concert with Yankovic.

"Headline News" was released on September 26, 1994, as the lead-off single for Permanent Record: Al in the Box, which was also released a day later. Yankovic also insisted that the song be commercially available as a CD single so that his fans who are completists would not have to purchase the expensive box set just to get the new song. Much like the cover for the Crash Test Dummies's 1993 studio album God Shuffled His Feet (which included "Mmm Mmm Mmm Mmm"), the cover for Yankovic's single superimposes his face over the figures of Titian's painting Bacchus and Ariadne. The art direction is credited to Doug Haverty, and design is credit to Daniel Sorenson, David McDougall. The b-side of "Headline News" was a remix of Yankovic's 1986 original song "Christmas at Ground Zero". The song was never officially released on a studio album, although it did appear on Yankovic's Greatest Hits Volume II album, which was released a month later on October 25, 1994. The single charted and peaked at number four on the Billboard Bubbling Under Hot 100 Singles chart, which corresponds to a position of 104 on the Billboard Hot 100. This made it Yankovic's first domestically charting single since 1992's "Smells Like Nirvana".

Brad Roberts, the original songwriter for "Mmm Mmm Mmm Mmm" was extremely pleased with the parody, and found it humorous. He later noted, "People assume that I was annoyed but when [Yankovic] does a parody of you, you know you've made it." He later praised the way Yankovic interacted with the artists that he parodies: "Weird Al goes the whole route and cultivates a relationship with the artist. Plus he gets half the earnings and that helps me make money."

=== Reviews ===
"Headline News" received mostly positive reviews from music critics. Lou Carlozo of the Chicago Tribune wrote that the song "provided savage laughs at the expense of Tonya Harding and John Bobbitt." Roch Parisien of AllMusic cited the song as one of the three stand-outs from Yankovic's second greatest hits volume, and called it a "rib-tickler". Tina Maps of The Milwaukee Journal wrote a positive review and felt that the musical parody was a "dead-on skewering of the Crash Test Dummies' 'Mmm, Mmm, Mmm, Mmm". Not all reviews, however, were so positive; an article that appeared in The Commercial Appeal noted that while the video for "Headline News" had some "cute bits and unusual cameos", it was "not as clever as many of Yankovic's past efforts" and that "the current events included here are already dated".

=== Live performances ===
Yankovic first started performing "Headline News" in August 1994, almost a month before it was officially released. In addition, Yankovic has performed the song with the Crash Test Dummies twice: once on Canada's MuchMusic channel and another time at the House of Blues in Los Angeles. Reportedly, during one of the performances, Ellen Reid, backing vocalist and keyboardist for the Crash Test Dummies, went out and purchased kazoos. The band then hid the instruments until the end of the song, when they took them out and played them; this "came as a big surprise to" Yankovic. Yankovic's Straight Outta Lynwood concert tour contained new lyrics as part of a parody medley, referencing Britney Spears, dealing with her 2007 head-shaving shock and underpants-less limousine trip in late 2006. Later in the tour, he changed it to reference Paris Hilton's DUI and imprisonment, and her subsequent interview on Larry King Live.

== Track listing ==
CD single

1. "Headline News" – 3:46
2. "Christmas at Ground Zero" (alternate mix) – 3:07

== Charts ==
Chart (1994)	Peak position
U.S. Billboard Bubbling Under Hot 100 Singles	4

== See also ==
- List of singles by "Weird Al" Yankovic
- List of songs by "Weird Al" Yankovic
