= Strings Attached Tour =

2019 concert tour by "Weird Al" Yankovic

- Tour by "Weird Al" Yankovic
- Location: North America
- Start date: June 5, 2019
- End date: September 1, 2019
- Legs: 1
- No. of shows: 66

"Weird Al" Yankovic concert chronology
- The Ridiculously Self-Indulgent, Ill-Advised Vanity Tour (2018); Strings Attached Tour (2019); The Unfortunate Return of the Ridiculously Self-Indulgent, Ill-Advised Vanity Tour (2022–2023)

The Strings Attached Tour was a concert tour by "Weird Al" Yankovic. The tour began on June 5, 2019 at the Ruth Eckerd Hall in Clearwater, Florida and ended on September 1, 2019 at the Verizon Arena in North Little Rock, Arkansas.

== Background ==
Throughout 2018, Yankovic performed concerts as part of the Ridiculously Self-Indulgent, Ill-Advised Vanity Tour. The tour saw Yankovic perform in small theaters and opera houses with sets focusing on his original songs and "style parodies." For the Strings Attached tour, Yankovic and his band performed with female backing singers and an orchestra. The orchestra was either a philharmonic or a collective of local musicians. The tour was announced in October 2018. Yankovic announced the tour dates on November 12, 2018.

== Setlist ==
The following setlist was taken from www.weirdal.com. Missing are arguably Yankovic's best-known parodies, "Eat It" and "Fat", both originally from Michael Jackson. Yankovic pulled the songs after the airing of the HBO documentary Leaving Neverland, in which two men alleged that Jackson sexually abused them as children.

Main show

1. Fun Zone
2. Unplugged Medley: I Lost On Jeopardy/I Love Rocky Road/Like A Surgeon
3. The Biggest Ball of Twine in Minnesota
4. Word Crimes
5. One More Minute (every other show)
6. Jurassic Park
7. Don't Download This Song
8. Weasel Stomping Day
9. You Don't Love Me Anymore (every other show)
10. Tacky
11. Harvey the Wonder Hamster
12. Jackson Park Express
13. Smells Like Nirvana
14. Dare To Be Stupid
15. White & Nerdy
16. Amish Paradise
17. The Saga Begins
18. Yoda

== Tour dates ==
List of 2019 concerts
Date	City	Country	Venue
June 5	Clearwater	United States	Ruth Eckerd Hall
June 6	Fort Lauderdale	United States	Broward Center for the Performing Arts
June 8	Melbourne	United States	King Center for the Performing Arts
June 9	St. Augustine	United States	St. Augustine Amphitheatre
June 10	Orlando	United States	Hard Rock Live
June 13	New Orleans	United States	Saenger Theatre
June 14	Irving	United States	The Pavilion at Toyota Music Factory
June 15	The Woodlands	United States	Cynthia Woods Mitchell Pavilion
June 16	San Antonio	United States	Majestic Theatre
June 18	Austin	United States	Bass Concert Hall
June 20	Memphis	United States	Orpheum Theatre
June 21	Oklahoma City	United States	Oklahoma City Zoo Amphitheatre
June 22	St. Louis	United States	Fox Theatre
June 23	Madison	United States	Overture Center for the Arts
June 25	Roanoke	United States	Berglund Performing Arts Theatre
June 27	Richmond	United States	Virginia Credit Union Live!
June 28	Simpsonville	United States	Heritage Park Amphitheatre
June 29	Nashville	United States	Ascend Amphitheater
June 30	Atlanta	United States	Chastain Park
July 2	Fort Wayne	United States	Foellinger Theatre
July 3	Kettering	United States	Fraze Pavilion
July 5	Rochester Hills	United States	Meadow Brook Amphitheatre
July 6	Cleveland	United States	Playhouse Square
July 7	Pittsburgh	United States	Benedum Center
July 8	Toronto	Canada	Budweiser Stage
July 11	Syracuse	United States	Landmark Theatre
July 12	Philadelphia	United States	Metropolitan Opera House
July 13	Cary	United States	Koka Booth Amphitheatre
July 14	Charlotte	United States	Charlotte Metro Credit Union Amphitheatre
July 16	Vienna	United States	Wolf Trap National Park for the Performing Arts
July 18	Gilford	United States	Bank of New Hampshire Pavilion
July 19	Mashantucket	United States	Foxwoods Resort Casino
July 20	New York City	United States	Forest Hills Stadium
July 21	Boston	United States	Leader Bank Pavilion
July 23	Lewiston	United States	Artpark Amphitheater
July 25	Interlochen	United States	Interlochen Center for the Arts
July 26	Grand Rapids	United States	DeVos Performance Hall
July 27	Milwaukee	United States	Miller High Life Theatre
July 28	Highland Park	United States	Ravinia Festival
July 30	Cedar Rapids	United States	McGrath Amphitheater
July 31	Lincoln	United States	Pinewood Bowl Theater
August 1	Morrison	United States	Red Rocks Amphitheatre
August 3	Phoenix	United States	Comerica Theatre
August 4	San Diego	United States	San Diego Civic Theatre
August 7	Las Vegas	United States	Smith Center for the Performing Arts
August 8	Costa Mesa	United States	Pacific Amphitheatre
August 9	Berkeley	United States	Greek Theatre
August 10	Los Angeles	United States	Greek Theatre
August 11	Sacramento	United States	Memorial Auditorium
August 13	Wenatchee	United States	Town Toyota Center
August 14	Troutdale	United States	Edgefield
August 16	Seattle	United States	Paramount Theatre
August 17; 2 shows	Seattle	United States	Paramount Theatre
August 18	Airway Heights	United States	Northern Quest Casino Amphitheatre
August 19	Vancouver	Canada	Queen Elizabeth Theatre
August 21	Victoria	Canada	Save-On-Foods Memorial Centre
August 22	Abbotsford	Canada	Abbotsford Centre
August 24; 2 shows	Calgary	Canada	Jack Singer Concert Hall
August 25	Billings	United States	Rimrock Auto Arena at MetraPark
August 26	Bismarck	United States	Bismarck Event Center
August 27	Saint Paul	United States	Minnesota State Fair
August 29	Indianapolis	United States	Farm Bureau Insurance Lawn
August 30	Peoria	United States	Peoria Civic Center
August 31	Kansas City	United States	Starlight Theatre
September 1	North Little Rock	United States	Verizon Arena
