= I Didn't Mean to Turn You On =

1984 single by Cherrelle

Single by Cherrelle

from the album Fragile
- B-side: "I Didn't Mean to Turn You On (Instrumental)"
- Released: 1984
- Genre: Minneapolis sound; funk; R&B
- Length: 7:03 (album version); 6:21 (special remix version); 3:58 (single edit)
- Label: Tabu
- Songwriters: James Harris III; Terry Lewis
- Producers: Jimmy Jam and Terry Lewis

Cherrelle singles chronology
"I Didn't Mean to Turn You On" (1984)	"Fragile… Handle with Care" (1984)

"I Didn't Mean to Turn You On" is a song originally performed as the debut single by the American singer Cherrelle, released in 1984. Written by Jimmy Jam and Terry Lewis, the lyrics have the singer attempting to rebuff unwanted sexual advances following a date, including pressure to have a one-night stand. Cherrelle's single was a hit on the US R&B chart.

In 1986, "I Didn't Mean to Turn You On" was covered more successfully by the English singer Robert Palmer who had a Top 10 hit in the US and the UK.

== Original Cherrelle version ==
The song was released as Cherrelle's debut single and was her first hit, peaking at number 8 on the soul chart and number 79 on the Hot 100. On the US dance chart, "I Didn't Mean to Turn You On" went to number 6. A slightly altered version of the song is featured in the 2015 N.W.A biopic Straight Outta Compton.

The music video pays homage to King Kong, featuring characters Cherrelle (as the protagonist) and the beast (presumably King Kong) in various scenes. In the end, the whole video turns out to be the singer's dream as she wakes up touching a King Kong comic book.

=== Charts ===
Chart (1984–1985)	Peak position
US Billboard Hot 100	79
US Dance/Disco Top 80 (Billboard)	6
US Hot Black Singles (Billboard)	8

== Robert Palmer version ==
"I Didn't Mean to Turn You On"
- UK vinyl single

Single by Robert Palmer

from the album Riptide
- B-side: "Get It Through Your Heart"
- Released: July 7, 1986
- Length: 3:43
- Label: Island
- Songwriters: James Harris III; Terry Lewis
- Producer: Bernard Edwards

Robert Palmer singles chronology
"Hyperactive" (1986)	"I Didn't Mean to Turn You On" (1986)	"Discipline of Love" (re-issue) (1986)

Music video
- "I Didn't Mean To Turn You On" on YouTube

The English rock singer Robert Palmer recorded a cover version of "I Didn't Mean to Turn You On" one year later, and it was released as the fifth single from his eighth album, Riptide (1985). The single reached No. 2 on the Billboard Hot 100 in 1986. Palmer loved the song musically, but he found the lyrics distasteful and sexist because he thought they were written by older men to be sung by a young woman. Palmer recorded it in part as a joke, thinking it would be an ironic role reversal to have the lyrics coming from a nearly 40-year-old man. The music video which was directed by Terence Donovan and storyboarded by concept developer Andrew Trovaioli, featured women like the ones featured in "Addicted to Love"; it reached No. 1 on MTV on October 17, 1986.

=== Charts ===
==== Weekly charts ====
Chart (1986)	Peak position
Australia (Kent Music Report)	26
Canada (The Record)	16
Canada Top Singles (RPM)	13
Europe (European Hot 100 Singles)	48
New Zealand (Recorded Music NZ)	23
UK Singles (Official Charts)	9
US Billboard Hot 100	2
US Dance Club Songs (Billboard); Remix	26
US Dance Singles Sales (Billboard); Remix	14
US Mainstream Rock Airplay (Billboard)	41
US Cash Box Top 100	4

==== Year end charts ====
Chart (1986)	Position
Canada Top Singles (RPM)	75
US Billboard Hot 100	46

== Other cover versions ==
- Queen Latifah sampled Cherrelle's version on her song "Turn You On" from her 1998 album Order in the Court.
- Mariah Carey covered the song in 2001 for the soundtrack to the film Glitter. Jimmy Jam and Terry Lewis also produced Carey's cover and she sang over the original instrumental. In 2026, she later remixed the song along with Rochelle Jordan for Glitter's 25th anniversary.
