= Body percussion =

Subset of body music

Body percussion may be performed on its own or as an accompaniment to music and/or dance. Examples of countries' folk traditions that incorporate body percussion include Indonesian saman, Ethiopian armpit music, palmas in flamenco, and the hambone from the United States. Body percussion is a subset of "body music".

== Body percussion sounds ==
Percussion instruments produce their sound when a player hits, scrapes, rubs or shakes them to produce vibrations. These techniques can also be applied to the human body. The body also presents several unique possibilities including the use of inhaled or exhaled air and vocal sounds.

Traditionally the four main body percussion sounds (in order from lowest pitch to highest in pitch) are:

1. Stomping: Striking left, right, or both feet against the floor or other resonant surface
2. Patting: Patting either the left, right, or both thighs or cheeks with hands
3. Clapping hands together
4. Snapping fingers

However, there are numerous other possibilities including: hitting the chest, whistling, slapping or flicking the cheeks with an open mouth, clicking with the tongue against the roof of the mouth, grunting, and hitting the buttocks.

Variations of sound are possible through changing the playing technique. For example, clapping the hands in various positions will affect factors such as pitch and resonance.

== Music education ==
Body percussion is used extensively in music education, because of its accessibility—the human body is the original musical instrument and the only instrument that every student possesses. Using the body in this manner gives students a direct experience of musical elements, such as beat, rhythm, and metre and helps a student internalise rhythmic skills. Certain approaches to music education, including Orff, Kodály, and Bapne make particular use of body percussion.

== Performers ==
Body percussion may be performed solo or several performers may combine to create a musical ensemble. One of the most accomplished body percussion soloists is Keith Terry. Terry resides in San Francisco, California and in the 1980s he established Cross Pulse, a non-profit organization dedicated to the creation, performance and recording of rhythm-based, intercultural music and dance. Perhaps the most famous body percussion ensemble is the United Kingdom percussion group Stomp. Stomp perform in a musical genre known as trash percussion, which involves the use of non-traditional instruments combined with body percussion. In Brazil, the most well-known body percussion group is Barbatuques.

== See also ==
- Armpit fart
- Beatboxing
- Konnakol
- Vocal percussion

== Print sources ==
- Romero-Naranjo, F.J. Percusión corporal y lateralidad. (Body percussion and laterality), 2012.
- Dietrich Woehrlin. Rhythmic & Body Percussion. Book/CD, Coda Verlag, 2008, ISBN 978-3940161-17-8
- Romero-Naranjo, F.J. "Body Percussion in the Physical Education and Sports Sciences. An Approach to its Systematization According to the BAPNE Method". International Journal of Innovation and Research in Educational Sciences, 2020.
- Romero-Naranjo, F.J. Body percussion Basic. Book, Bodymusic-Bodypercussion Press, 2003.
- Romero-Naranjo, F.J. Cognitive Solfege. Book. Bodymusic-Bodypercussion Press, 2019.
- Martin J. Junker. Six Bagatells for Body Percussion Solo. Dinklage 2000 (Gretel-Verlag, Germany)
- Romero-Naranjo, F.J. "Body Percussion and Team Building through the BAPNE Method". SHS Web of Conferences 26(3), 2016.
- Romero-Naranjo, F.J. "Percusión Corporal en diferentes culturas" (Body percussion in different cultures). Música y Educación, 2008.
