= Armpit fart =

Trapping air in a person's armpit to create sound

An armpit fart, made by trapping and releasing air between the hand and armpit, is a simulated fart. Armpit farts occur in the context of play, humor, comedy, and music. As a form of body percussion, the maneuver has also been used in music and musical games, where it may be called called armpit squeezing or playing the armpit.

== Background ==
An armpit fart is a simulation of the sound of flatulence made by creating a pocket of air between the armpit of a partially raised arm and the hand, then swiftly closing the pocket by bringing the arm close to the torso, causing the air to push against the skin, creating the noise.

In music, the same maneuver has been called playing the armpit or, without mention of the hand, armpit squeezing. It is a form of body music or body percussion. (Note: By contrast, there are apparatuses, including aerophones, that can produce a similar sound, from musical instruments (e.g., bassoons, kazoos) to practical joke devices.)

== Contexts ==
=== Play ===
Flatulence is socially stigmatized, causing many people to hide or deny it and even endure discomfort to avoid embarrassment. But youths may imitate it by making an armpit fart or blowing a raspberry. As a form of humor and play in youth culture, such behavior serves to test social taboos, explore bodily boundaries, or negotiate belonging within peer groups. Youths generally learn that these behaviors become less socially acceptable with age, in later stages of child development.

=== Comedy ===
As a form of humor, armpit farts can be considered juvenile or crude. Comedian George Carlin in LP record albums of his performances spoke of "the artificial fart under the arm".

=== Music and games ===
External videos
- Music using the armpit, YouTube

Armpit farting or the musical maneuver of playing the armpit, as in armpit music, can feature the armpit prominently or be used to accompany singing, dancing, or other music. It has also been described in musical games. The maneuver has been in widespread use, from Russia to France, and has been used by young Ethiopian men to accompany dances. Composer Igor Stravinsky recalled learning it as a child from a mute peasant who used it to accompany musical vocalizations.

== See also ==
- Clapping game
- Manualism (hand music)
- Slapstick
