= Hyperactive (Robert Palmer song) =

Single by Robert Palmer

from the album Riptide
- B-side: "Woke Up Laughing"
- Released: May 1986 (US)
- Recorded: 1985
- Studio: Compass Point (Nassau, Bahamas)
- Genre: Dance-rock
- Length: 3:35 (7" version); 5:08 (album version)
- Label: Island
- Songwriters: Dennis Nelson; Tony Haynes; Robert Palmer
- Producer: Bernard Edwards

Robert Palmer singles chronology
| "Addicted to Love" (1986) | "Hyperactive" (1986) | "I Didn't Mean to Turn You On" (1986) |

Audio video
- "Hyperactive" on YouTube

"Hyperactive" is a song by the English singer Robert Palmer, which was released in 1986 as the fourth single from his eighth studio album Riptide (1985). The song was written by Dennis Nelson, Tony Haynes and Palmer, and produced by Bernard Edwards. Released as the follow-up to his US chart topper "Addicted to Love", "Hyperactive" reached No. 33 on the Billboard Hot 100 and was the first time Palmer had scored two consecutive top 40 US hits from an album. It remained on the charts for twelve weeks.

== Release ==
"Hyperactive" was released by Island Records on 7" vinyl in the US, Europe, Australia, New Zealand and Japan. A 12" vinyl version was released in Europe, with a promotional-only version also issued in the US. For its release as a single, "Hyperactive" was edited to reduce its duration. The B-side, "Woke Up Laughing", had originally appeared on Palmer's sixth studio album Clues (1980).

== Critical reception ==
Upon release, Cash Box commented: "An aggressive, tough-edged rhythm track [which] should capitalize on Palmer's newfound star status. Danceable and featuring his characteristic soulish vocal, "Hyperactive" has tons of radio appeal." In a retrospective review of Riptide, Tim DiGravina of AllMusic noted how the album was made up of "mostly rocking songs", with "Hyperactive" "add[ing] a bit of a pop veneer to the formula, with its bright keyboards dating the song to the Miami Vice era; that's not to say it doesn't hold nostalgic charm."

== Track listing ==
7" single

1. "Hyperactive (Edit)" – 3:35
2. "Woke Up Laughing" – 3:36

7" single (US promo)

1. "Hyperactive (Edit)" – 3:35
2. "Hyperactive (Edit)" – 3:35

12" single (European release)

1. "Hyperactive" – 5:05
2. "Hyperactive (Edit)" – 3:35
3. "Woke Up Laughing" – 3:36

12" single (US promo)

1. "Hyperactive (Vocal LP Version)" – 5:08
2. "Hyperactive (Vocal LP Version)" – 5:08

== Personnel ==
- Robert Palmer – vocals
- Bernard Edwards – producer, bass
- Eddie Martinez – guitar
- Tony Thompson – drums
- Jason Corsaro – engineer
- Eric Thorngren – mixing
- Jack Skinner – mastering

== Chart performance ==
| Chart (1986) | Peak position |
|---|---|
| Australia (Kent Music Report) | 72 |
| US Billboard Hot 100 | 33 |
| US Billboard Top Rock Tracks | 21 |
