= Yoda (song) =

Song performed by "Weird Al" Yankovic

Song by "Weird Al" Yankovic

from the album Dare to Be Stupid
- Released: June 18, 1985
- Recorded: February 20, 1985
- Genre: Comedy rock
- Length: 3:58
- Label: Scotti Brothers
- Songwriters: "Weird Al" Yankovic; Ray Davies
- Producer: Rick Derringer

"Yoda" is a song by "Weird Al" Yankovic from his third album, Dare to Be Stupid (1985). It is a parody of the song "Lola" by the Kinks. Inspired by the events of the movie The Empire Strikes Back, the song is told from the point of view of Jedi-in-training Luke Skywalker and concerns his dealings with Master Yoda on the planet Dagobah. The song was initially written and recorded in 1980, during the original release of The Empire Strikes Back and achieved success on The Dr. Demento Show; however, securing permission from both Star Wars creator George Lucas and "Lola" songwriter Ray Davies delayed the physical release of the song for about five years.

"Yoda" was never released as a single, nor was a music video ever made for it. Nevertheless, the parody has gone on to be one of Yankovic's most famous songs. It was re-released twice in 1994: on his second greatest hits set and the box set Permanent Record and also on the 2009 compilation The Essential "Weird Al" Yankovic. The song is also a staple during Yankovic's live shows, and an idiosyncratic chant dubbed "The Yoda Chant" is often performed during the song's middle portions.

== History ==
=== Early success ===
"Yoda" was originally written by "Weird Al" Yankovic in 1980 when the epic space opera The Empire Strikes Back was playing in theaters. The film introduced the character of Yoda, the ancient Jedi Master who trains Luke in the ways of the Force following the demise of Obi-Wan Kenobi. Yankovic later jokingly said that, "Prior to The Empire Strikes Back, the thought of writing a song about Yoda had never occurred to me." He considered writing a song based on the "break-out character", but was unable to find a suitable piece to parody until one of his friends proposed that he use "Lola"—"which I couldn't believe that I hadn't thought of myself, since I was such a huge Kinks fan."

Yankovic wrote and recorded a version of the song, using only an accordion, with "Musical Mike" Kieffer blowing milk bubbles and making hand sounds, on a 4-track cassette Portastudio. This version of "Yoda" was a success on The Dr. Demento Show, and peaked at number one on the "Funny Five" countdown for several weeks. This early demo was later released on the sixth volume of Dr. Demento's Basement Tapes.

=== Obtaining permission ===
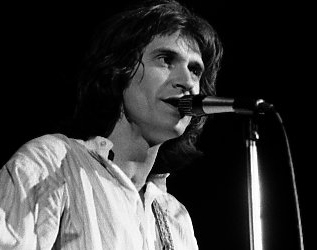
"Lola" was written by Ray Davies and performed by his band, the Kinks.

Yankovic wanted to include the song on one of his albums, since the demo version had been so popular. However, securing permission from both George Lucas and the Kinks delayed the physical release of the song for about five years. Although Lucas eventually gave Yankovic permission, the song's publishers turned Yankovic down. "Yoda" might have remained unreleased had it not been for a chance encounter between Yankovic and Ray Davies, who wrote "Lola". When Yankovic asked him why he had not given his permission, Davies responded that he had never been asked. Davies ultimately gave Yankovic permission to record the song, and the song was later released on Yankovic's third album, Dare to Be Stupid. For subsequent parodies, Yankovic has attempted to approach the songwriters themselves for permission rather than their publishers whenever possible.

"Yoda" was re-recorded on February 20, 1985. This version of the song does not feature an accordion and is truer, musically, to the original Kinks song. Yankovic later said, "It's kind of a backlash from the first album, where we had accordion on everything. It just became a little overwhelming to me."

=== Continuing popularity ===
After Dare to Be Stupid was released, Yankovic considered "Yoda" a "cool album track" rather than a potential single due to the age of both The Empire Strikes Back and the original song. This, and the fact that the majority of the album's video budget went to the then-current "Like a Virgin" parody, meant that a "Yoda" video would not be feasible. Nevertheless, the song has gone on to be one of Yankovic's most famous parodies and a fan favorite. The song was featured on the Greatest Hits Volume II (1994), the box set Permanent Record (1994), and the 2009 compilation The Essential "Weird Al" Yankovic. The song appeared on "The Time Machine" episode of The Weird Al Show, and on the compilation album Radio Disney: Kid Jams.

== Live performances ==
"Yoda" was played at the end of every show for the tours promoting Yankovic's albums Dare to Be Stupid, Off the Deep End, Alapalooza, Bad Hair Day, Running with Scissors, Poodle Hat, Alpocalypse, and Mandatory Fun. He also occasionally used it to end shows of the Ridiculously Self-Indulgent, Ill-Advised Vanity Tour of 2018, and it is included in the "Unplugged Medley" which ended concerts of the Unfortunate Return of the Ridiculously Self-Indulgent, Ill-Advised Vanity Tour. Starting with the 1999 Touring with Scissors shows, the song has been preceded by that album's Star Wars–themed single, "The Saga Begins". For the Straight Outta Lynwood tour, the band moved both songs to the middle of the set, and performed "Albuquerque" as their finale. Beginning in June 2010, "Yoda" has again been the final encore. Unlike the album version of "Yoda", which uses the same instrumentation as "Lola", Yankovic adds accordion accompaniment in live performances; this can be seen on the video releases "Weird Al" Yankovic Live! and "Weird Al" Yankovic Live! – The Alpocalypse Tour.

Since 1992, an a cappella chant (often referred to as the "Yoda chant"), originally performed during the bridge of "Another One Rides the Bus" in 1991 during the Dr. Demento 20th Anniversary Show, has been included in live performances, and is considered a staple of Yankovic's shows. Midway through "Yoda", the band slowly ceases playing and goes into the chant, which Yankovic wrote himself. Originally, the chant consisted mainly of mnemonic syllables accompanied by synchronized movements from the band. Over the years, the chant has grown to include, among other things, pieces from "Grim Grinning Ghosts" (the theme to Disneyland attraction The Haunted Mansion), phrases from The Trashmen's "Surfin' Bird" and "Frère Jacques", and elements of the "Hawaiian War Chant" and the "Aussie Aussie Aussie, Oi Oi Oi" chant. On the Mandatory Fun Tour in 2015, a piece of the "four-way-crimp" from The Mighty Boosh was also added, on the Unfortunate Return of the Ridiculously Self-Indulgent, Ill-Advised Vanity Tour in 2022, an excerpt of "The Lion Sleeps Tonight" was added to the chant in addition to a Balinese kecak. Most recently in 2025, on his Bigger and Weirder Tour, he added the beginning of “Hooked on a Feeling”.

In 2015, as part of Comedy Central's Night of Too Many Stars, a benefit for New York Collaborates for Autism, Yankovic performed the song with 13-year-old Jodi DiPiazza, a noted autistic pianist.

== Personnel ==
- "Weird Al" Yankovic – lead and background vocals, keyboards
- Jim West – guitars
- Steve Jay – bass guitar
- Jon "Bermuda" Schwartz – drums, congas, maracas, bubbles
- Pat Regan – piano
