= John Twomey (musician) =

Musician and attorney

John Twomey is a manualist who appeared on NBC's The Tonight Show Starring Johnny Carson in 1972 and 1974 (and additionally including December 31, 1986). He is credited with bringing manualism to the public stage, as his performance of "Stars and Stripes Forever" was seen by millions of people and was included in the Best of Johnny Carson collection. Twomey also coined the term "manualism," as he introduced himself as a "manualist" in the show. Twomey was a regular guest of Johnny's after that first appearance all the way until Johnny retired from The Tonight Show.

John Twomey, also a professional attorney from Grand Rapids, Michigan and father of 7, appeared on several other programs including The Mike Douglas Show where he performed the "Colonel Bogey March," made famous in the film The Bridge on the River Kwai, The Merv Griffin Show where he performed "When the Saints Go Marching In." Twomey's name appeared in the credits of a 1970s Barney Miller episode in which he provided off-camera manualism for a scene in which a man was arrested for disturbing the peace by "playing" his hands. He performed on the CBS Television Network show "The Jerry Reed When You're Hot You're Hot Hour" in 1972. He gave his first public performance at a university talent show when attending the University of Michigan.

John Twomey's last public performance was on November 21, 1998, on the radio show A Prairie Home Companion with Garrison Keillor, where he performed "Stardust."

Although John suffered a heart attack that forced him to stop practicing law and performing his unique style of music, after ten years he recovered and was back to performing.
