= Discipline of Love =

Single by Robert Palmer

from the album Riptide
- Released: October 1985
- Recorded: 1985
- Studio: Compass Point (Nassau, Bahamas)
- Length: 6:06 (album version); 3:20 (single version)
- Label: Island
- Songwriters: David Batteau; Don Freeman
- Producer: Bernard Edwards

Robert Palmer singles chronology
"All Around the World" (1985)	"Discipline of Love" (1985)	"Riptide" (1986)

Music video
- "Discipline of Love" on YouTube

"Discipline of Love" is a song by the English rock singer Robert Palmer. It was released as the lead single from his eighth studio album, Riptide (1985).

== Critical reception ==
On its release, Roger Morton of Record Mirror wrote, "Slabs of hollow, rattling bass, punctuated by raunchy guitars and shots of brass leaves little room for Robert's vocal subtleties. Too much chant, and not enough chart."

== Charts ==
Chart	Position
UK Singles (Official Charts)	95
US Billboard Hot 100	82
