= She Makes My Day =

1988 single by Robert Palmer

Single by Robert Palmer

from the album Heavy Nova
- B-side: "Disturbing Behaviour"
- Released: 3 October 1988
- Genre: Rock
- Length: 4:21
- Label: EMI
- Songwriter: Robert Palmer
- Producer: Robert Palmer

Robert Palmer singles chronology
"Simply Irresistible" (1988)	"She Makes My Day" (1988)	"Early in the Morning" (1988)

Music video
- "She Makes My Day" on YouTube

"She Makes My Day" is a song by English singer-songwriter Robert Palmer, released in 1988 as the third single from his ninth studio album, Heavy Nova. The song was written and produced by Palmer. "She Makes My Day" reached No. 6 in both the United Kingdom and Ireland.

== Composition ==
In Michael Luckman's book Alien Rock: The Rock 'n' Roll Extraterrestrial Connection, Palmer said of writing the track, "I didn't give much thought to it at all. It was like automatic writing."

== Release ==
"She Makes My Day" was released by EMI on 7-inch vinyl in the UK, Europe, Australia and the US. A 12-inch vinyl version was released in the UK and Spain, while a CD edition was also issued in the UK and Japan. All editions featured the B-side "Disturbing Behaviour", except the US and Japanese releases. The US release featured "Casting a Spell" as the B-side, and "Change His Ways" for the Japanese release. All three B-sides appeared on Heavy Nova.

== Promotion ==
A music video was filmed to promote the single. It received medium rotation on MTV.

== Critical reception ==
Upon release, Billboard listed the song as a recommended single under the "Pop" category and described it as a "lilting, easy-paced rock ballad". James Masterton, in his 2015 book The Top 40 Annual 1988, described the song as a "smouldering Sinatra-esque slow jazz single". In a retrospective review of Heavy Nova, Terry Staunton of Record Collector believed the song was an "intricately layered ballad" and "arguably the sweetest few minutes in his entire catalogue".

== Track listings ==
7-inch single

1. "She Makes My Day" – 4:21
2. "Disturbing Behaviour" – 3:43

7-inch single (US release)

1. "She Makes My Day" – 4:21
2. "Casting a Spell" – 3:55

12-inch single

1. "She Makes My Day" – 4:21
2. "Disturbing Behaviour" – 3:43
3. "Simply Irresistible (E.T. Remix)" – 6:33

CD single (UK release)

1. "She Makes My Day" – 4:23
2. "Disturbing Behaviour" – 3:45
3. "Simply Irresistible (E.T. Remix)" – 6:33

CD single (Japanese release)

1. "She Makes My Day" – 4:23
2. "Change His Ways" – 2:56

== Personnel ==
- Robert Palmer – vocals, producer
- Eric "E.T." Thorngren – mixing
- David Harper – executive producer
- The Artful Dodgers Ltd – sleeve design
- Neil Matthews – photography

== Charts ==
Chart (1988–1989)	Peak position
Australia (ARIA)	9
Europe (Eurochart Hot 100)	22
Ireland (IRMA)	6
Italy Airplay (Music & Media)	16
Netherlands (Single Top 100)	57
New Zealand (Recorded Music NZ)	47
UK Singles (Official Charts)	6

== Release history ==
Region	Date	Format(s)	Label(s)	Ref.
Europe	3 October 1988	7-inch vinyl	EMI	
Japan	1 March 1989	Mini-CD	EMI	
