= Mendel Center =

Performing arts center in Benton Township, Michigan

Coordinates: 42.09689°N 86.38988°W

The Mendel Center for Arts and Technology, popularly shorted to Mendel Center, is a performing arts center located in Benton Township, Michigan on the campus of Lake Michigan College.

It consists of the 1,517-seat Mainstage Theatre, the 247-seat Hanson Theatre and 20,000 square feet of meeting and special event space with seating of up to 1,200 at Grand Upton Hall. The Mainstage Theatre is used primarily for concerts, Broadway and family stage shows, graduation ceremonies and other special events. It features a 4,559-square-foot stage, a 54-seat orchestra pit, 1,097 seats in the main level and a 420-seat mezzanine that serves as a balcony. The Mainstage contains four restrooms and two concession stands, plus two coat rooms.

The Mainstage is surrounded by several additional rooms including a telecommunications studio, two rehearsal halls, the Hanson Theater which is used for smaller plays, classrooms, meeting rooms and the Grand Upton Hall which is used for trade shows, conventions and other events and is divisible into five rooms. There is an extra coat room near Grand Upton Hall.
