= Change His Ways =

Single by Robert Palmer

from the album Heavy Nova
- B-side: "More Than Ever"
- Released: 2 May 1989
- Recorded: 1987
- Length: 2:56
- Label: EMI
- Songwriter: Robert Palmer
- Producer: Robert Palmer

Robert Palmer singles chronology
| "Early in the Morning" (1988) | "Change His Ways" (1989) | "Tell Me I'm Not Dreaming" (1989) |

Audio video
- "Change His Ways" on YouTube

"Change His Ways" is a song by English vocalist Robert Palmer, released in 1989 as the fourth single from his ninth studio album, Heavy Nova (1988). The song was written and produced by Palmer. "Change His Ways" reached No. 28 in the UK.

A music video, featuring the use of animation and cartoon characters designed by the Italian artist and cartoonist Massimo Mattioli, was filmed to promote the single. The video parodies the highly successful Terence Donovan-directed videos for "Addicted to Love", "I Didn't Mean to Turn You On" and "Simply Irresistible" by replacing the backing models with caricature animated birds. The song itself features yodelling and Zydeco accordion.

== Release ==
"Change His Ways" was released by EMI on 7" vinyl in the UK, Europe and Australasia. 12" vinyl and CD formats were issued in the UK and Europe, while a limited edition 7" picture disc was released in the UK. All 7" editions featured the B-side "More Than Ever", which also appeared on Heavy Nova.

== Critical reception ==
Upon release, People commented on the song: "It starts out with a South African tinge then drifts through a reggae mood, a Louisiana riff or two, some mundane pop and, saints preserve, a snatch of yodeling. This is one of those notions that reads better than it sounds, and it doesn't read all that amusingly".

== Track listing ==
7" single

1. "Change His Ways" – 2:57
2. "More Than Ever" – 3:25

12" single

1. "Change His Ways (Wed 9PM Mix)" – 5:16
2. "More Than Ever" – 3:25
3. "Change His Ways (Rock Mix)" – 4:51

CD single

1. "Change His Ways" – 2:57
2. "Change His Ways (Wed 9PM Mix)" – 5:16
3. "More Than Ever" – 3:25
4. "She Makes My Day" – 4:23

== Chart performance ==
| Chart (1989) | Peak position |
|---|---|
| Australian Singles Chart | 38 |
| Belgian Singles Chart (V) | 39 |
| Dutch Singles Chart | 47 |
| German Singles Chart | 62 |
| Irish Singles Chart | 21 |
| New Zealand Singles Chart | 29 |
| UK Singles Chart | 28 |

== Personnel ==
- Robert Palmer – vocals, producer
- Eric "E.T." Thorngren – mixing
- Film Quarters – sleeve design
- Kevin Davies – photography
- Massimo Mattidi – sleeve artwork (origination of characterisation)
