= Girl U Want =

1980 single by Devo

Single by Devo

from the album Freedom of Choice
- B-side: "Mr. B's Ballroom"
- Released: April 24, 1980
- Studio: Record Plant (Hollywood)
- Genre: New wave; synth-pop
- Length: 2:56
- Label: Warner Bros.
- Songwriters: Mark Mothersbaugh; Gerald Casale
- Producers: Devo; Robert Margouleff

Devo singles chronology
"Gut Feeling" (1979)	"Girl U Want" (1980)	"Whip It" (1980)

Music video
- "Girl U Want" on YouTube

"Girl U Want" is a 1980 single by American new wave band Devo. It was the first single released from their third studio album, Freedom of Choice (1980).

== Composition ==
"Girl U Want" was allegedly inspired by the song "My Sharona" by the Knack, although Devo bassist and co-writer Gerald Casale has denied this claim. The lyrics, in typical Devo style, describe a relationship marked by unrequited love/lust for a woman. "Girl U Want" was first performed in December 1979 in a similar arrangement to the album version.

== Music video ==
In the music video for "Girl U Want", Devo performs for a group of young women in the style of a performance from The Ed Sullivan Show, with two robotic backup dancers, one male and one female. Further implying the televised nature of the performance, the color in the video is deliberately altered to make the red of the band's energy dome headgear look almost purple. The band wears the silver naugahyde suits from the cover of Freedom of Choice, and mime the song with Moog Liberation synthesizers.

During the video, the camera focuses on the girls in the audience exaggeratedly enjoying the performance, including one girl who is visually implied to "wet" herself, which transitions to a scene of General Boy controlling the backup dancers. At one point, Mark Mothersbaugh pulls aside the curtain behind the band to show an overweight man on a vibrating exercise machine, attempting to drink a milkshake to the ecstatic reaction of the audience. As the video ends, girls in the audience are shown holding signs with icons, including an electrical outlet.

== Critical reception ==
Record World said that "A snakey guitar winds around the boisterous lead vocals that proclaim the winning hook." Dave Swanson of Ultimate Classic Rock ranked "Girl U Want" as Devo's seventh best song, stating that it is "about as catchy as Devo songs come" and that "the lyrics are a typical balance of the traditional crashing into the unexpected."

Steve Huey of AllMusic noted the song in a review of the album, stating: "Several tunes – like the oft-covered 'Girl U Want' – have a geeky (but pragmatic) romantic angst that was new to Devo albums, although the band's view of relationships is occasionally colored by their cultural themes of competition and domination." Huey also highlighted "Girl U Want" as an album standout by labeling it an AMG Pick Track. Greg Prato of AllMusic reviewed the song itself, stating it was "definitely one of the most overlooked gems to surface from the early-'80s new wave movement".

== Robert Palmer version ==
"Girl U Want"

Single by Robert Palmer

from the album Honey
- B-side: "No Fuss"
- Released: June 27, 1994
- Studio: Logic Studios (Milan, Italy)
- Genre: Pop rock; hard rock
- Length: 2:23
- Label: EMI
- Songwriters: Gerald Casale; Mark Mothersbaugh
- Producer: Robert Palmer

Robert Palmer singles chronology
"Witchcraft" (1992)	"Girl U Want" (1994)	"Know by Now" (1994)

Audio video
- "Girl U Want" on YouTube

In 1994, "Girl U Want" was covered by British singer Robert Palmer. Produced solely by Palmer, the song was released as the lead single from his twelfth studio album, Honey (1994), by EMI Records, and reached number 57 on the UK Singles Chart.

A music video was filmed and directed by Howard Greenhalgh to promote the single. Palmer also performed the song on the UK music show Top of the Pops on June 16, 1994.

=== Critical reception ===
In a review of Honey, Lesley Mathew of AllMusic said, "Palmer himself sounds as inhumanly suave as ever, though much of the material is a prescription for déjà vu. Tracks like the funk-lashed cover of Devo's 'Girl U Want' are dead ringers for the stuff on the Riptide album." People described Palmer's version as "head-banging new wave".

=== Track listing ===
- 7-inch single
1. "Girl U Want" – 2:23
2. "No Fuss" – 3:11
- CD single (UK/Netherlands release)
1. "Girl U Want" – 2:23
2. "Girl U Want (The Pinaxa Mix)" – 3:02
3. "No Fuss" – 3:11
- CD single (Japan release)
1. "Girl U Want" – 2:23
2. "Know by Now" – 4:10
3. "Girl U Want (The Pinaxa Mix)" – 3:02

=== Personnel ===
Production

- Robert Palmer – producer
- Pino "Pinaxa" Pischetola – mixing, remixer of "The Pinaxa Mix"

Sleeve

- Howard Greenalgh – art montage
- Nigel Parry – photography
- Bill Smith Studio, London – design

=== Charts ===
Chart (1994)	Peak position
Australia (ARIA)	118
UK Singles (OCC)	57
UK Airplay (Music Week)	25

== Alternate versions and covers ==
In 1981, Devo recorded an instrumental easy listening version of the song for a fan club distributed cassette tape. This version was popular enough to be performed live, with vocals, on the 1982 tour. In 1992, Soundgarden recorded a cover of the song. In 1995, a reunited Devo, joined by Bulimia Banquet vocalist Jula Bell, recorded a slowed-down version for the action comedy film Tank Girl. The version with Bell and Devo singing is heard in the film's opening sequence, but the version on the soundtrack album is Devo without Bell. That same year, "Girl U Want" played during the ending credits of the parody film Dr. Jekyll and Ms. Hyde. Another re-recording of "Girl U Want" was used for the music videogame Rock Band. In 2006, Devo re-recorded the song once again for Radio Disney's Devo 2.0 project, the track appearing as "Boy U Want", featuring 13-year-old Nicole Stoehr singing altered lyrics over the familiar backing tracks by Devo. Freelance Whales recorded a slow ballad version of "Girl U Want" in 2011 as the B-side of the rare vinyl-exclusive Split 7" EP in collaboration with Foals.
