= Manualism (hand music) =

Art of making noise by squeezing air through the hands

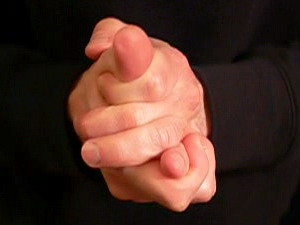
Manualism: Squeezing air through the hands to play musical notes

Manualism is the art of playing music by squeezing air through the hands. Because the sound produced has a distinctly flatulent tone, such music is usually presented as a form of musical comedy or parody. The musical performer is called a manualist, who may perform a cappella or with instrumental accompaniment.

Playing recognizable tunes by squeezing the hands together is extremely difficult, and takes many years of practice and even then is still difficult to perform. As a result, there are very few manualists performing on stage.

== Technique ==
Just as a trumpeter makes sound by blowing air between the lips, a manualist makes sound by squeezing air between two hands.

The hands are held together, trapping a pocket of air between the two palms. Using the fingers of one hand, the air is squeezed out the top, between the base of the thumb and the opposite hand, to form a musical note. The pitch is determined by the force used to hold the hands together. The tighter the grip, the higher the note.

== Historical references ==
Records of manualists performing the art prior to the 20th century have yet to be discovered, though it seems likely that someone must have attempted to make music in this fashion from the earliest days of musical parody.

=== First documented manualist ===
A Universal Studios newsreel from 1933 may be the oldest filmed record of a manualist performing the art. The footage documents a farmer named Cecil Dill from Traverse City, Michigan, who claims that he first learned to play "Yankee Doodle" in 1914.

=== John Twomey ===
In 1974, John Twomey, a successful Grand Rapids, Michigan attorney, performed "Stars and Stripes Forever" on NBC's The Tonight Show Starring Johnny Carson. This performance was seen by several million people in the United States, not only in 1974, but annually for many years thereafter, as the segment was repeated many times on the annual Best of Carson shows. It is also included in the Best of Johnny Carson collection.

Twomey introduced himself as "a manualist", the first known use of the term in a musical context. He appeared on several other programs including The Mike Douglas Show where he performed the "Colonel Bogey March," made famous in the film The Bridge Over the River Kwai, and The Merv Griffin Show where he performed "When the Saints Go Marching In." He provided audio for the Barney Miller episode "The Dentist," first aired December 27, 1979, in which a manualist musician is hauled in for disturbing the peace.

John Twomey's last public performance was on November 21, 1998, on the radio show A Prairie Home Companion with Garrison Keillor, where he performed "Stardust".

=== Mike "Musical Mike" Kieffer ===
Musical Mike appeared on the Dr. Demento show and has collaborated with "Weird Al" Yankovic. He has performed on a number of Yankovic's songs, and appeared in the music videos for "I Love Rocky Road" in 1983, and "Headline News" in 1994.

== Current exponents ==
- Bruce Gaston, AKA "Mr. Handman", is best known for his pitch accuracy and the use of vibrato, which he pioneered. The "Gaston & Purcell" musical duo has performed together since 1992, with Ken Purcell supplying instrumental and vocal accompaniment. Gaston appeared with Jim Rotondo and Ben Brenner on NBC's The Tonight Show with Jay Leno on February 15, 2001, as part of an act billed as "The Three Tendons". His radio interview on NPR's All Things Considered aired on April 25, 2000. Gaston began playing his hands in 1967.
- Jim Rotondo, AKA "Jimi Handtrix", performs not only with his hands, but also with a tire pump. Also a member of "The Three Tendons" musical act, he has performed on dozens of TV and radio shows in the United States, on everything from CBS's Return of The Gong Show (October 22, 1988) to NBC's America's Got Talent (June 26, 2007). Jimi Handtrix, adorned in afro & tie-dye, performed at HBO's Annual Comedy Festival in Aspen, CO in March 2007 and was on Comcast ON DEMAND from April 17, 2007 – May 28, 2007.
- Sean Hulings was a guest on NBC's The Tonight Show with Jay Leno in a segment called "The Tonight Show Side Show," August 14, 2004, performing the theme from Indiana Jones.
- R. A. Wilson is a Silicon Valley software engineer. Inspired by John Twomey's 1974 performance on The Tonight Show Starring Johnny Carson, Wilson's hands (and only his hands) first appeared in public on the Internet via Google Video on January 24, 2006. His video of The Flintstones Theme was chosen as a "Google Pick" on May 2, 2006. He performed "Hail to the Chief" during a radio interview that aired on NPR: Morning Edition on July 25, 2006. The TV Land U.S. cable channel hired Wilson to record a series of promotional music videos of TV theme songs called "Hand Tunes", which premiered August 28, 2006.
- Maher A. Haddad, also known as "Handini", appeared on 5 episodes of season 2 of Country Fried Home Videos on CMT, and on Talkshow with Spike Feresten on Fox on February 14, 2009.
- Mika Castaldo, also known as "HandFartMaster", is a Canadian businessman and manualist made famous by his 2017 appearance on PewDiePie's video "The Funniest Thing in the Universe" as well as a 2013 tweet by Hank Green. His videos have achieved over 300,000 views on YouTube although the account has been inactive since 2011. He has been featured in articles by the Huffington Post and Glide Magazine, often lampooning his stonefaced expression.
- Shane Bertrand's "Squirt Gun" CD was reviewed on the syndicated Lex and Terry radio show, February 22, 2007. Bertrand's music is also being used to introduce the "Scotch and DUI" radio show on "Rock 102" in Fargo, North Dakota, as of March 5, 2007.
- Bruce Gaston and Jim Rotondo accompanied by tooth player Larry Schwarz (dressed as a giant hand) appeared on America's Got Talent, on June 26, 2007, as "The Pennsylvania Hand Band".
- Gerry Phillips performed "Bohemian Rhapsody" on ABC's Jimmy Kimmel Live! in a segment titled "Internet Talent Showcase" on August 31, 2007. He later performed in three television commercials for Australia's Dunlop Volley shoes. Phillips has also been featured on Channel 4 show "Rude Tube".
- Adam Deibert, also known as Prince Adam, is an American multi-instrumentalist whose skills include manualism. As a former member of the Californian rock band The Aquabats, he provided "hand wind" accompaniment for several of the band's early tracks, and often performed such at their live shows, doing covers of popular songs. In 2007, he was featured in a segment on the children's television program Yo Gabba Gabba! playing a rendition of "Twinkle Twinkle Little Star".
- Jem Stride, from Bristol, appeared on Britain's Got Talent on April 22, 2009.
- Bruce Thomas, handyman, performed "Yankee Doodle" on NBC's America's Got Talent July 8, 2009
- Alex Fletcher, from Staffordshire, performed "The Imperial March" on ITV's Britain's Got Talent on April 17, 2011. Judge and former Baywatch star David Hasselhoff considered it "Wrong on so many levels."
- Glenn Herdling, an American comic book writer and author, performs a variety of popular songs on his YouTube channel, "Handmaster Herdling." He is perhaps best known for his repertoire of Christmas carols.
- Jack Mansager performed a segment of "Gee, Officer Krupke" in the Broadway show Blast! from 1999 to 2001.
- Mike McGowan, AKA "Super Famous Mike", performed "America the Beautiful" on MTV's gameshow "Amazingness" in 2017.
- Guy First, recently appeared on "Britain's Got Talent" (S13E2), where he passed through to the Semi-finals. In 2020 appeared on Germany's Das-Supertalent and received the golden buzzer. He has also been featured in recent articles by online magazine Metalinjection. The magazine mentions his latest manualist music covers, which have reached over 150.000 views on social media.
- Richard Cross appeared on the Claim To Fame segment of Noel Edmonds' Late Late Breakfast Show in the late 1980s. Introduced by Steve Ryder he performed the Match of the Day theme tune, and also the theme tune for Eastenders.

== See also ==
- Hand jive
- Armpit fart
