= Uptown Theater (Napa, California) =

Uptown Theatre
- Interactive map of Uptown Theatre
- Address: 1350 Third Street; Napa, California
- Coordinates: 38.2964905°N 122.2874341°W
- Owner: John Anthony Truchard
- Capacity: 863

Construction
- Opened: August 12, 1937
- Reopened: May 14, 2010
- Rebuilt: 2010
- Years active: 1937-2000, 2010-Present

Website
- www.uptowntheatrenapa.com

The Uptown Theatre is an entertainment venue located in Napa, California, United States. The theater is in an Art Deco style building that originally opened to the public in 1937. As of 2023 it is utilized as a concert and entertainment venue with a seating capacity of 863.

== History ==
The theater was originally constructed as a movie and live entertainment venue. Built by owner at the time, Lawrence Borg, The Uptown made its public debut on August 12, 1937, showing the film Ever Since Eve. Borg sold the Uptown Theater as well as the Fox Theater which was also located in downtown Napa to the Blumfield theater chain in 1945. Blumfield upgraded the Uptown's projection system to a Cinemascope system in 1954. The theater's existing 23 foot screen was replaced with a 40 foot screen to accommodate the Cinemascope specifications. The theater was first divided in half in 1973 to create a two screen venue and again divided in the late 1986 in order to accommodate four screens showing second run movies. Ownership and management of the theater changed hands several times in the 1990s and closed in 2000 due to falling attendance and competition from other newer facilities.

After purchasing the Uptown Theatre in 2000, real estate developer George Altamura announced in 2003 that he had partnered with several investors including Francis Ford Coppola in a project to restore the building as a live entertainment venue. Restoration of the theater's exterior was completed in 2005. As restoration of the interior took place, several coats of paint were removed from the ceiling revealing an original Greco-Roman mural. Artists were brought in to restore the artwork to original form and completed in 2009. Meyer Sound Laboratories played a key role in the design of the venue's sound system.

The theater reopened on May 14, 2010, with a performance by Big Bad Voodoo Daddy. Since reopening, the theater has hosted several hundred performers including Willie Nelson, Boz Scaggs, Leon Russell, Rosanne Cash, George Thorogood, Merle Haggard, John Prine, Emmylou Harris, Jerry Jeff Walker, Lily Tomlin, B.B. King, Glen Campbell, John Hiatt, Los Lonely Boys, Cyndi Lauper, Lyle Lovett and Robert Cray.

The theater's ceiling was damaged during the 2014 South Napa earthquake. Although the structure of the building was determined to be sound, the building was red tagged until repairs were completed. The first post-earthquake event was a concert featuring Ziggy Marley which took place on November 9, 2014.

The venue was purchased in 2022 by John Anthony Truchard and is featuring the JaM Cellars Presents music series.
