= Riptide (album) =

Studio album by Robert Palmer
- Released: 4 November 1985
- Recorded: July–September 1985
- Studios: Compass Point (Nassau, Bahamas)
- Genre: Rock
- Length: 34:55
- Label: Island
- Producer: Bernard Edwards

Robert Palmer chronology
Pride (1983)	Riptide (1985)	Heavy Nova (1988)

Singles from Riptide
- 1. "Discipline of Love" Released: October 1985; 2. "Riptide" Released: January 1986 (UK); 3. "Addicted to Love" Released: January 1986 (US); 4. "Hyperactive" Released: May 1986 (US); 5. "I Didn't Mean to Turn You On" Released: July 1986 (UK)

Riptide is the eighth studio album by the English singer Robert Palmer, released on 4 November 1985 by Island Records. The album was recorded over a period of three months in 1985 at Compass Point Studios in Nassau, Bahamas. The album peaked at No. 5 on the UK Albums Chart and at No. 8 on the US Billboard 200. It was certified double Platinum in the US by the RIAA in March 1996 and certified Gold in the UK by BPI in August 1986. It features the songs "Addicted to Love", "I Didn't Mean to Turn You On", "Hyperactive", "Discipline of Love", and the title track "Riptide" which were all released as singles. The single "Addicted to Love" was accompanied by an iconic and much-imitated music video, directed by Terence Donovan, in which Palmer is surrounded by a bevy of near-identically clad, heavily made-up female "musicians," either mimicking or mocking the painting style of Patrick Nagel. In September 1986, Palmer performed "Addicted to Love" at the 1986 MTV Video Music Awards in Los Angeles, California. In 1987, he won the Grammy Award for Best Male Rock Vocal Performance for "Addicted to Love". At the 1987 Brit Awards, Palmer received his first nomination for Best British Male.

Another single from Riptide, his cover of R&B singer Cherrelle's "I Didn't Mean to Turn You On", also performed well (US No. 2, UK No. 9). The song, "Trick Bag," was written by one of Palmer's major influences, New Orleans blues artist Earl King.

For the album, Palmer collaborated with two former members of his band the Power Station: guitarist Andy Taylor and drummer Tony Thompson. The Power Station's producer Bernard Edwards also played bass and produced the album. The album also features contributions from Chaka Khan and notable session musicians such as Guy Pratt, Wally Badarou, Jeff Bova, Eddie Martinez, Dony Wynn, and Jack Waldman (who died a year after the album's release).

The title track of the album is a cover of a 1933 song written by Walter Donaldson and Gus Kahn and first recorded by Eddy Duchin and his orchestra.

== 2013 reissue ==
Riptide was reissued on 30 April 2013 by Culture Factory USA, an independent label that specialises in cult artists. The reissue CD was packaged in a miniature replica of the original quality vinyl packaging complete with an inner sleeve that features the original lyrics, photographs of Palmer and credits for the album. The label side of the CD features a replica of what the original Island label looked like at the time of issue and even features "grooves" as if the black CD is made of vinyl.

The reissues did not have any additional outtakes or bonus tracks.

== Critical reception ==
Professional ratings
Review scores
Source	Rating
AllMusic	4.5/5 stars
Record Mirror	3/5 stars
Robert Christgau	C+

In a contemporary review music critic Robert Christgau gave the album a "C+" and described it as "his pop breakthrough" and added that "what makes him barely listenable is his holdings in r&b."

In a retrospective review for AllMusic, critic Tim DiGravina gave the album four and a half out of five stars and wrote that "Riptide packages Robert Palmer's voice and suave personality into a commercial series of mostly rocking songs that seem custom-tailored to be chart hits."

== Track listing ==
Side one
No.	Title	Writer(s)	Length
1.	"Riptide"	Walter Donaldson; Gus Kahn	2:24
2.	"Hyperactive"	Tony Haynes; Dennis Nelson; Robert Palmer	5:08
3.	"Addicted to Love"	Palmer	6:03
4.	"Trick Bag" (Earl King cover)	Earl King	3:01

Side two
No.	Title	Writer(s)	Length
5.	"Get It Through Your Heart"	Palmer	2:49
6.	"I Didn't Mean to Turn You On" (Cherrelle cover)	James Harris III; Terry Lewis	3:43
7.	"Flesh Wound"	Frank Blair; Palmer	3:43
8.	"Discipline of Love"	David Batteau; Don Freeman	6:06
9.	"Riptide" (Reprise)	Donaldson; Kahn	2:00
Total length:			34:55

Additional tracks

Bonus tracks on Pride + Riptide 2013 release
1. "Discipline of Love" (12" Mix) – 4:49; 2. "Riptide/Get It Through Your Heart Medley" (Promo 7" Mix) – 4:33; 3. "Sweet Lies" (12" Version) – 5:36; 4. "Let's Fall in Love" (B-Side of "Addicted to Love" – mislabelled on sleeve as "Previously Unreleased") – 4:02; 5. "I Didn't Mean To Turn You On" (12" Mix) – 4:24 [mislabelled – this is the LP version slightly longer]; 6. "No Not Much" (Live on the Tube) (B-Side of "Riptide") – 2:33; 7. "Trick Bag" (Live on the Tube) (B-Side of "Riptide") – 3:12; 8. "Les Planches" (French Version of "Some Guys Have All The Luck") (Previously Unreleased) – 4:08

== Personnel ==
Credits are adapted from the Riptide liner notes.

- Robert Palmer – vocals, backing vocals
- Wally Badarou – keyboards
- Jeff Bova – keyboards
- Jack Waldman – keyboards
- Eddie Martinez – guitars
- Andy Taylor – guitar (3)
- Bernard Edwards – bass (1–7, 9)
- Guy Pratt – bass (8)
- Tony Thompson – drums (1–4, 6, 7, 9)
- Dony Wynn – drums (5, 8)
- Lenny Pickett – saxophone
- Benny Diggs – backing vocals (3, 8)
- Fonzi Thornton – backing vocals (3, 8)
- Chaka Khan – vocal arrangements (3)

== Production ==
- Producer – Bernard Edwards
- Post-production – Eric "ET" Thorngren and Robert Palmer
- Engineer – Jason Corsaro
- Assistant engineers – Michael Abbott, Benjamin Armbrister, Steve Boyer, Jamie Chaleff, John Davenport, Billy Miranda, Dan Peterkofsky and Steve Rinkoff.
- Mixed by Eric "ET" Thorngren
- Recorded at Compass Point Studios (Nassau, Bahamas).
- Mixed at The Power Station, Electric Lady Studios, The Hit Factory and Right Track Recording (New York, NY).
- Mastered by Jack Skinner at Sterling Sound (New York, NY).
- CD mastering by Barry Diament at Atlantic Studios (New York, NY).
- Illustration – Susan Palmer
- Design – Robert Palmer
- Photography – Giuseppe Pino

== Charts ==
=== Weekly charts ===
Chart (1985–1986)	Peak position
Australia Albums (Kent Music Report)	17
Canadian Albums (RPM)	2
Dutch Albums (Album Top 100)	72
New Zealand Albums (RMNZ)	13
UK Albums (Official Charts)	5
US Billboard 200	8

=== Year-end charts ===
Chart (1986)	Position
US Billboard 200	11
Chart (1987)	Position
US Billboard 200	63

== Certifications ==
Certifications for Riptide
Region	Certification	Certified units/sales
Canada (Music Canada)	3× Platinum	300,000^{^}
United Kingdom (BPI)	Gold	100,000^{^}
United States (RIAA)	2× Platinum	2,000,000^{^}
^{^} Shipments figures based on certification alone.

== Release history ==
Label	Cat. No.		Format	Date
Island	90471-1, 7 90471-1	^{US}	Vinyl	1985
Island	7 90471-4	^{US}	Cassette	1985
Island	610 541-222, CID 130, 90471-2	^{GE}	CD	1985>
Island	ICT 9801	^{UK}	Cassette	1985
Island	407 083-630, 407 083	^{GE}	Cassette	1985
Island	ZCI-9801	^{UK}	Cassette	1985
Island	A4-90471, A4 90471	^{US}	Cassette	1985
Island	ISLC-1066, ISLC 1066	^{CA}	Cassette	1985
Island	ILPS 9801	^{UK,} ^{IRE,} ^{PO,} ^{SC}	Vinyl	1985
Island	R25D-2014	^{JP}	Vinyl	1985
Island	ISL 1066	^{CA}	Vinyl	1985
Island	7 90471-2	^{US}	CD	1986
Island	P35D 20010	^{JP}	CD	24 April 1987
Island, Island Masters	826 463-2, IMCD 25	^{EU}	CD	1989
Island Masters	PSCD-1152	^{JP}	CD	25 November 1991
Island Masters	UICY-6600	^{JP}	CD	22 November 2006
Culture Factory	782026	^{FRA}	CD	30 April 2013
