= Heavy Nova (album) =

Studio album by Robert Palmer
- Released: 22 June 1988
- Recorded: 1987
- Studio: Logic (Milan, Italy) Compass Point (Nassau, The Bahamas)
- Genres: Hard rock; heavy metal; bossa nova
- Length: 38:29
- Labels: EMI, Manhattan
- Producer: Robert Palmer

Robert Palmer chronology
Riptide (1985)	Heavy Nova (1988)	Addictions: Volume 1 (1989)

Singles from Heavy Nova
- 1. "Simply Irresistible" Released: 31 May 1988; 2. "She Makes My Day" Released: 3 October 1988 (UK); 3. "Early in the Morning" Released: October 1988 (US); 4. "Change His Ways" Released: 2 May 1989 (UK); 5. "Tell Me I'm Not Dreaming" Released: June 1989 (US); 6. "It Could Happen to You" Released: 14 August 1989

Professional ratings
Review scores
Source	Rating
AllMusic	2/5 stars
The Rolling Stone Album Guide	2.5/5 stars

Heavy Nova is the ninth studio album by the English singer Robert Palmer, released in 1988. His first album for EMI Records after a 15-year association with Island Records, it followed Palmer's very successful album Riptide (1985).

== Background ==
The name Heavy Nova derives from Palmer's love of both heavy metal and bossa nova rhythms. The album continued Palmer's popularity with the single "Simply Irresistible", which spent three weeks at No. 1 on the Billboard Mainstream Rock Tracks chart in the United States. On the Billboard Hot 100, it was a number-two peak; it was also a number-two hit in Canada and a number-one hit in Australia.

The album peaked at No. 13 in the US, No. 17 in the UK and No. 15 in the Netherlands. The album was certified Platinum by RIAA in November 1988 and Gold by BPI in November 1988. It remains Palmer's second most successful album worldwide, behind his 1985 album Riptide.

== Recording ==
The album was recorded at Logic Studios in Milan, Italy and Compass Point Studios in The Bahamas during 1987.

== Track listing ==
All tracks written by Robert Palmer, except where noted.

No.	Title	Writer(s)	Length
1.	"Simply Irresistible"		4:14
2.	"More Than Ever"		3:25
3.	"Change His Ways"		2:56
4.	"Disturbing Behavior"		3:45
5.	"Early in the Morning"	Lonnie Simmons; Rudy Taylor; Charlie Wilson	4:42
6.	"It Could Happen to You"	Johnny Burke; Jimmy Van Heusen	2:32
7.	"She Makes My Day"		4:23
8.	"Between Us"		4:49
9.	"Casting a Spell"		3:57
10.	"Tell Me I'm Not Dreaming"	Michael Omartian; Bruce Sudano; Jay Gruska	3:46

== Personnel ==
- Robert Palmer – vocals, backing vocals
- William Bryant – keyboards
- Misha Schneider – keyboards
- Jeff Bova – additional keyboards
- Richard Gibbs – additional keyboards
- Garth Hudson – accordion, additional keyboards
- Tom "T-Bone" Wolk – accordion
- Eddie Martinez – guitars
- Dennis Budimir – additional guitars
- John Grey – additional guitars, additional percussion
- Frank Blair – bass guitar
- Barry "Sun John" Johnson – additional bass guitar
- Dony Wynn – drums
- Ricky Fataar – additional drums
- Dom Um Romão – percussion, additional backing vocals
- Robyn Lobe – additional percussion
- Chuck Findley – trumpet
- Luka Belak – violin
- Clare Fischer – strings
- Rick Danko – additional backing vocals
- B.J. Nelson – additional backing vocals

=== Production ===
- David Harper – executive producer
- Robert Palmer – producer, art direction
- Tim Kramer – engineer
- Bookie Epsie – assistant engineer
- Scott Forman – assistant engineer
- Roy Sweeting – assistant engineer
- Eric Thorngren – mixing
- Richard Cobble – production coordinator
- Henry Marquez – design
- Terence Donovan – photography
- Tony Baglio – management
- Pino Pischetola – management

== Charts ==
=== Weekly charts ===
Chart (1988–1989)	Peak position
Australian Albums (ARIA)	2
Dutch Albums (Album Top 100)	42
German Albums (Offizielle Top 100)	50
New Zealand Albums (RMNZ)	14
Swedish Albums (Sverigetopplistan)	47
UK Albums (Official Charts)	17
US Billboard 200	13

=== Year-end charts ===
Chart (1988)	Position
Australian Albums (ARIA)	23
US Billboard 200	69
Chart (1989)	Position
Australian Albums (ARIA)	24

== Certifications ==
Region	Certification	Certified units/sales
Australia (ARIA)	2× Platinum	300,000
Canada (Music Canada)	Platinum	100,000^{^}
United Kingdom (BPI)	Gold	100,000^{^}
United States (RIAA)	Platinum	1,000,000^{^}
^{^} Shipments figures based on certification alone.

== See also ==
- List of albums released in 1988
