= Christmas at Ground Zero =

1986 single by "Weird Al" Yankovic

- Promotional 12" label

Single by "Weird Al" Yankovic

from the album Polka Party!
- B-side: "One of Those Days"
- Released: November 1986
- Recorded: April 23, 1986
- Genre: Comedy; Christmas carol
- Length: 3:08
- Label: Rock 'n Roll; Scotti Brothers
- Songwriter: Alfred Yankovic
- Producer: Rick Derringer

"Weird Al" Yankovic singles chronology
"Living with a Hernia" (1986)	"Christmas at Ground Zero" (1986)	"Fat" (1988)

Music video
- "Christmas at Ground Zero" on YouTube

"Christmas at Ground Zero" is an original song by "Weird Al" Yankovic, the tenth and final track on his 1986 album, Polka Party! and the final single from the album, released just in time for the 1986 Christmas season. The song is a style parody of Phil Spector-produced Christmas songs.

== Lyrics and recording ==
"Christmas at Ground Zero" is an upbeat song that juxtaposes typical Christmas activities with attempts to survive a nuclear holocaust (e.g., Yankovic sings about "dodg[ing] debris as we trim the tree underneath a mushroom cloud"). Musically, the song is a style parody of A Christmas Gift for You from Phil Spector, a Christmas compilation album produced by Phil Spector and featuring The Ronettes, The Crystals and Darlene Love; Yankovic produced the song complete with Spector's trademark "big, glossy Wall of Sound production".

The song was the result of Yankovic's label, Scotti Brothers Records, insisting that Yankovic record a Christmas album. However, after Yankovic presented the song to his label, they relented, because it was "a little different from what they were expecting." After the song was written and recorded, Yankovic wanted to release the song as a commercial single, but Scotti Bros. refused. Undeterred, he used his own money to create a low-budget music video made mostly out of stock footage. Eventually, Scotti Bros. released the song as a promotional single and was released commercially.

== September 11 attacks ==
The expression "ground zero" was largely connected with nuclear explosions at the time this song was written. After the September 11, 2001 attacks, the term was used to refer to the location of the destroyed World Trade Center towers. Due to the new associations of the title, Yankovic's song received far-reduced airplay since 2001, but continues to appear in novelty programming such as the Dr. Demento show. Yankovic later said:

The sad part is, I can’t really play the song live anymore because too many people misunderstand the connotations of Ground Zero. It’s not a reference to 9/11, obviously. It was written in 1987 [sic] when 'ground zero' just meant the epicenter of a nuclear attack.

== Music video ==
The music video was made during the mid 1980s, near the end of the Cold War. This music video was also Yankovic's directing debut. The video is a montage of old film, television, and news footage, including a montage from the civil defense film for children, Duck and Cover, and a pre-presidential Ronald Reagan, capped off with a live-action scene of Yankovic and some carolers wearing gas masks, singing with rubble around them. This live action finale was filmed in the Bronx, New York, in an economically devastated area that looked like a warhead had exploded. The video was edited with Yankovic by Darren Bramen, with final edits and effects by John Peterson.

Yankovic stated that the record label did not want to pay for this video to be made, due to associating a nuclear disaster with the holidays. Yankovic instead funded production of the video himself. In the late 1980s, the song was a staple on MTV during the holiday season.

== Reception and legacy ==
The song has been well received. Julio Diaz of the Pensacola News Journal wrote "While 'Grandma Got Run Over by a Reindeer' got old decades ago, this is one musical dose of sick holiday humor that hasn't lost its novelty." He went on to compliment the music video as well, calling it "a lot of fun". Joey Green, in his book Weird and Wonderful Christmas, named the track one of "The Weirdest Christmas Songs of All Time". The song, according to Yankovic himself, is a fan-favorite.

== Track listing ==
1. "Christmas at Ground Zero" – 3:08
2. "One of Those Days" – 3:18

== See also ==
- "The Night Santa Went Crazy", a later Christmas song by Yankovic, from his album Bad Hair Day (1996)
- The Atomic Cafe – 1982 darkly comedic documentary featuring Cold War stock footage
