= Communication (The Power Station song) =

Single by the Power Station

from the album The Power Station
- B-side: "Murderess"
- Released: 28 October 1985 (UK)
- Studio: Power Station, New York City
- Genre: Rock
- Length: 3:37
- Label: Parlophone
- Songwriters: Derek Bramble; Robert Palmer; Andy Taylor; John Taylor
- Producer: Bernard Edwards

The Power Station singles chronology
"Get It On (Bang a Gong)" (1985)	"Communication" (1985)	"She Can Rock It" (1996)

Licensed audio
- "Communication" on YouTube

"Communication" was released as the third single from the Power Station's 1985 debut album. It featured "Communication" (special club mix), "Communication" (remix) and "Murderess" as the B-side. The remixes were done by Bernard Edwards and Josh Abbey.

The video contained an array of footage showing communication in the world with clips of the band performing the song in the studio.

== Track listings ==
7" Parlophone / R 6114 (UK)

1. "Communication" (7" remix) – 3:51
2. "Murderess" – 4:20

12" Parlophone / 12 R 6114 (UK)

1. "Communication" (special club mix) – 4:40
2. "Murderess" – 4:20
3. "Communication" (7" remix) – 3:51

12" Capitol / V-15204 (US)

1. "Communication" (special club mix) – 4:40
2. "Murderess" – 4:20

== Charts ==
Chart (1985)	Peak position
Australia (Kent Music Report)	95
UK Singles (OCC)	75
US Billboard Hot 100	34
