= She Can Rock It =

Single by the Power Station

from the album Living in Fear
- B-side: "Power Trippin'"; "Charanga"
- Released: 30 September 1996
- Genre: Rock
- Label: Chrysalis
- Songwriter(s): Robert Palmer; Andy Taylor; John Taylor; Tony Thompson
- Producer(s): Bernard Edwards

The Power Station singles chronology
"Communication" (1985)	"She Can Rock It" (1996)

Licensed audio
- "She Can Rock It" on YouTube

"She Can Rock It" is a song by the Power Station. Released as their only single from their 1996 album Living in Fear, it was the band's fourth and final single. It featured "Power Trippin'" as its B-side, a rock-funk song written by the band for the US version of the album, and also "Charanga" written by Robert Palmer. An alternate version of "Charanga" was released in 1998 on Palmer's compilation album Woke Up Laughing.

The band recorded a live performance for Top of the Pops. Despite this, the single spent one week at number 63 on the UK Singles Chart.
