= Golden Youth =

American indie/alternative band

- Origin: Sacramento, California
- Genres: Christian alternative rock, indie rock
- Years active: 2012–present
- Labels: Slospeak
- Members: Stephanie Lauren; Kyle Monroe; Aaron Tosti; Jesse Palmer; Patrick Boyle
- Website: Golden-Youth.com

Golden Youth is an American Indie/Alternative band from Sacramento, California, formed in 2012. The core of the band are singer/songwriters Stephanie Lauren and Kyle Monroe. They played a number of shows mostly in California and recently released their first album. Shortly before releasing the album they joined forces with manager and music industry veteran Tim Cook of N3W LEVEL in Los Angeles.

Golden Youth has been quickly developing a strong following through their videos on YouTube. They filmed their own unique videos for songs like "Brother in the Morning Light" and "Seven Seas". They have also posted their versions of Rod Stewart's "Forever Young" and The Lumineers' "Ho Hey".

== History ==
Golden Youth, formed in 2012 by friends Stephanie Lauren and Kyle Monroe. They played their first live show in Fresno, California at Kuppajoe on April 20, 2012, opening for Picture Atlantic. Since relocating to Nashville, Tennessee, the band have been touring the United States and featured in festivals such as SXSW.

== Members ==
- Stephanie Lauren – Vocals, keyboard, piano, harmonium, percussion (2012–present)
- Kyle Monroe – Guitars, background vocals, trombone, violin, French horn, programming, hembell (modified celesta), percussion (2012–present)
- Aaron Tosti - Drums, percussion, harmonium (2014–present)
- Jesse Palmer - Bass, glockenspiel, percussion (2014–present)
- Patrick Boyle - Guitars, percussion, glockenspiel, liberty bell, harmonium (2014–present)

== Past members ==
- Jesse Lendzion - Drums (2013–present)
- Steven Kent - Mellotron, guitar, percussion (2013–present)

== Discography ==
=== Studio albums ===
- Quiet Frame; Wild Light (SloSpeak Records, May 28, 2013)

=== EPs ===
- The Cabin (SloSpeak Records, Jul 29, 2014)
- Seven Seas EP (self-released, 2012)
