= The Rare, the Raw and the Rest =

The Rare, the Raw, and the Rest

Compilation album by Thunder
- Released: 21 June 1999
- Recorded: 1989–1999
- Genre: Hard rock
- Length: 73:52
- Label: EMI

Professional ratings
Review scores
Source	Rating
Allmusic	3.5/5 stars

The Rare, the Raw and the Rest is a 1999 compilation album by British hard rock band Thunder. It is a collection of b-sides, studio out-takes and live tracks recorded during the time that the band was signed to EMI Records, many of which were either unreleased or were unavailable on CD prior to their inclusion on this compilation. The album was compiled by the band's lead guitarist & primary songwriter Luke Morley.

== Track listing ==
Songs written by Luke Morley, except where noted:

1. Girl's Going Out Of Her Head
2. Another Shot of Love (live)
3. Baby I'll Be Gone (Luke Morley, Andy Taylor)
4. Stay With Me (Rod Stewart, Ronnie Wood)
5. She's Like Ice (previously unreleased) (Luke Morley)
6. Bigger Than Both Of Us (Luke Morley)
7. The Fire Is Gone (Luke Morley)
8. Stand Up (live acoustic) (Luke Morley, Garry James)
9. She's My Inspiration
10. Move On
11. 5:15 (Live) (Pete Townshend)
12. Future Train (second version - previously unreleased) (Mikael Hoglund, Garry James, Luke Morley, Ben Matthews)
13. Can't Get By On Love (previously unreleased)
14. Hand In A Glove (previously unreleased) (Luke Morley, Garry James)
15. History In The Making (previously unreleased)
16. Between The Covers (previously unreleased)

== Personnel ==
- Danny Bowes - vocals
- Luke Morley - guitars
- Gary James - drums, percussion
- Ben Matthews - guitars, piano, organ
- Mark 'Snake' Luckhurst - bass guitar on tracks 1,2,3,6,9,13 & 15
- Nick Linden - bass guitar on track 4
- Mikael Hoglund - bass guitar on tracks 8,10,11 and 12.
- Andy Taylor - guitar on "Stay With Me"
