= Out of Order (Rod Stewart album) =

Studio album by Rod Stewart
- Released: 23 May 1988
- Recorded: 1987–1988
- Studios: Record Plant (Los Angeles, California); Ocean Way Recording (Hollywood, California)
- Genre: Pop rock
- Length: 51:30
- Label: Warner Bros.
- Producers: Bernard Edwards; Rod Stewart; Andy Taylor

Rod Stewart chronology
Every Beat of My Heart (1986)	Out of Order (1988)	The Best of Rod Stewart (1989)

Singles from Out of Order
- 1. "Lost in You" Released: April 1988; 2. "Forever Young" Released: July 1988; 3. "My Heart Can't Tell You No" Released: September 1988; 4. "Crazy About Her" Released: January 1989

Professional ratings
Review scores
Source	Rating
AllMusic	2.5/5 stars
Robert Christgau	C
Rolling Stone	3/5 stars

Out of Order is the fifteenth studio album by Rod Stewart, released in May 1988. It features the hit singles "Lost in You", "Forever Young", "My Heart Can't Tell You No", and "Crazy About Her". The album was produced by Stewart and members of The Power Station: guitarist Andy Taylor (also a former member of Duran Duran), and bassist Bernard Edwards (formerly of Chic). Chic drummer Tony Thompson also plays on the record.

== Critical reception ==
The album was considered by many critics a return to form after a series of less successful albums. Stephen Thomas Erlewine of AllMusic in a retrospective review called it "well-constructed", and Rolling Stone magazine called it a "confident, well-written, high-voltage work". Robert Christgau, however, gave it a C, unfavorably comparing the album to the work of The Power Station.

== Commercial performance ==
The album reached No. 20 on the Billboard 200, eventually going 2× Platinum, which made it Stewart's best-selling album of the 1980s.

Each single released from the album went to the Top 20 of either the Mainstream Rock Tracks chart, the Hot Adult Contemporary Tracks chart, or the Billboard Hot 100. Music videos were also produced and released for each. The most successful single was "My Heart Can't Tell You No", which reached the Top 5 of both the Hot Adult Contemporary Tracks and Billboard Hot 100. The album had four charting hits in the U.S., the biggest being "My Heart Can't Tell You No" at No. 4.

In January 1989, immediately following the broadcast of Super Bowl XXIII, NBC Sports used "Forever Young" as the soundtrack for a year-in-review montage showcasing highlights from the 1988 Summer Olympics, the 1988 World Series, the 1989 Fiesta Bowl, and Super Bowl XXIII. All four events had been broadcast by NBC.

The structure of the lyrics to "Forever Young" are very similar to a Bob Dylan song of the same title. When this was realized, the song was then sent to Dylan, out of respect, asking whether he had a problem with it. Stewart and Dylan agreed to participate in the ownership of the song and share Stewart's royalties.

In Brazil, the album was certified Gold in 1994.

== Track listing ==
No.	Title	Writer(s)	Length
1.	"Lost in You"	Stewart, Andy Taylor	4:59
2.	"The Wild Horse"	Stewart, Taylor	4:58
3.	"Lethal Dose of Love"	Stewart, Taylor, Tony Brock	4:38
4.	"Forever Young"	Jim Cregan, Kevin Savigar, Bob Dylan, Stewart	4:03
5.	"My Heart Can't Tell You No"	Simon Climie, Dennis Morgan	5:12
6.	"Dynamite"	Stewart, Taylor	4:16
7.	"Nobody Knows You When You're Down and Out"	Jimmy Cox	3:50
8.	"Crazy About Her"	Duane Hitchings, Cregan, Stewart	4:53
9.	"Try a Little Tenderness"	Jimmy Campbell, Reginald Connelly, Harry M. Woods	4:27
10.	"When I Was Your Man"	Savigar, Stewart	5:14
11.	"Almost Illegal"	Stewart, Taylor	4:27

Extended version (2009)
No.	Title	Writer(s)	Length
12.	"Days of Rage"	Stewart, Taylor)	4:11
13.	"Crazy About Her (Kyle Wyld West Edit) [Instrumental]"		4:27
14.	"Crazy About Her (Al B. Sure! Remix)"		4:10
15.	"Crazy About Her (B! Crazy Dub Mix)"		6:29
16.	"Forever Young (Live, 1993)"		4:59
17.	"This Old Heart of Mine (Live, 1993)"		3:25

== Personnel ==
- Rod Stewart – vocals
- Bill Payne – acoustic piano (2, 6)
- William "Smitty" Smith – Hammond organ (2)
- Kevin Savigar – keyboards (3–5, 7–10)
- Duane Hitchings – keyboards (8)
- Michael Landau – guitar (1, 2, 4, 6–10), guitar solo (7)
- Andy Taylor – guitar (1–6, 11), guitar solo (1, 2, 4)
- David Lindley – mandolin (1, 2), slide guitar (7), fiddle (11)
- Jim Cregan – acoustic guitar (4), acoustic guitar solo (5), guitar (5, 7, 8)
- Eddie Martinez – guitar (9)
- Bob Glaub – bass (1, 5, 11)
- Bernard Edwards – bass (2–4, 6–10)
- Tony Thompson – drums (1, 2, 6, 9, 10)
- Tony Brock – drums (3–5, 11), programming (7, 8)
- Bobbye Hall – percussion (8)
- Lenny Pickett – saxophone (3, 7)
- Jimmy Roberts – saxophone (6, 8, 10), sax solo (9)
- David Woodford – saxophone (6, 8, 10)
- Earl Gardner – trumpet (3, 7)
- Bruce Miller – string arrangements (1, 5, 9, 10), brass arrangements (9)
- Kelly Emberg – backing vocals (1)
- Lyn Collins – backing vocals (2)
- Rita Johnson – backing vocals (2)
- Robert Sheen – backing vocals (2)

== Production ==
- Rod Stewart – producer
- Andy Taylor – producer
- Bernard Edwards – producer, mixing
- Jeff Hendrickson – engineer
- Steve MacMillan – engineer, mixing
- David Tickle – engineer
- Paul Wertheimer – engineer
- Alan Abrahamson – assistant engineer
- Bob Ludwig – mastering at Masterdisk (New York City, New York)
- Malcolm Cullimore – production coordinator
- Janet Levinson – art direction, design
- Randee St. Nicholas – photography
- Margo Chase – lettering
- Arnold Stiefel – management
- Randy Phillips – management

== Charts ==
=== Weekly charts ===
Chart (1988–1989)	Peak position
Australian Albums (ARIA)	23
Austrian Albums (Ö3 Austria)	10
Dutch Albums (Album Top 100)	37
German Albums (Offizielle Top 100)	6
New Zealand Albums (RMNZ)	47
Norwegian Albums (VG-lista)	11
Swedish Albums (Sverigetopplistan)	1
Swiss Albums (Schweizer Hitparade)	7
UK Albums (Official Charts)	11
US Billboard 200	20

=== Year-end charts ===
Chart (1988)	Position
German Albums (Offizielle Top 100)	36
US Billboard 200	53

Chart (1989)	Position
US Billboard 200	24

== Certifications ==
Region	Certification	Certified units/sales
Argentina (CAPIF)	Platinum	60,000^{^}
Brazil (Pro-Música Brasil)	Gold	100,000^{*}
Canada (Music Canada)	5× Platinum	500,000^{^}
Sweden (GLF)	Gold	50,000^{^}
United Kingdom (BPI)	Gold	100,000^{^}
United States (RIAA)	2× Platinum	2,000,000^{^}
^{*} Sales figures based on certification alone.^{^} Shipments figures based on certification alone.
