= Living in Fear =

- US release cover

Studio album by the Power Station
- Released: 30 September 1996
- Recorded: 1996
- Studios: Ocean (Los Angeles); The Hit Factory, Electric Lady and Avatar (New York City); Stonehenge (Milan); El Vino (Spain); Digital (Capri)
- Genre: Hard rock
- Length: 48:29
- Labels: Chrysalis/Capitol; Guardian (US)
- Producer: Bernard Edwards

The Power Station chronology
The Power Station (1985)	Living in Fear (1996)	Best of (2003)

Singles from Living in Fear
- 1. "She Can Rock It" Released: 30 September 1996

Professional ratings
Review scores
Source	Rating
AllMusic	3/5 stars

Living in Fear is the second and final studio album by the supergroup the Power Station, released in 1996.

== Background ==
In the pre-recording stage of the album, the band had the same lineup as for their previous album in 1985 (Robert Palmer, Andy Taylor, John Taylor and Tony Thompson), and all four musicians worked on the writing and arranging of the songs. However, John Taylor was going through a divorce at the time, as well as entering drug rehab, and pulled out before the album was recorded. Instead Bernard Edwards, the producer, played all bass parts on Living in Fear, and took over as the group's official fourth member. John Taylor still receives writing and arranging credits on the finished album, but does not play on it, and is not listed as a group member.

Unfortunately, Edwards died of pneumonia in Japan before the album was released; the album is dedicated to his memory. These two events did not help the album and it was not a commercial success, with only one single, "She Can Rock It", being released.

The band, now officially a trio, toured in support of the album in 1996, with Guy Pratt (bass) and Luke Morley of Thunder (additional guitar) along as session musicians. The set list included Palmer and Chic songs among material from both Power Station albums.

== Track listing ==
All tracks are written by Robert Palmer, Andy Taylor, John Taylor & Tony Thompson, except where noted.

No.	Title	Writer(s)	Length
1.	"Notoriety"		5:06
2.	"Scared"		4:06
3.	"She Can Rock It"		4:16
4.	"Let's Get It On"	Marvin Gaye, Ed Townsend	7:03
5.	"Life Forces"		4:08
6.	"Fancy That"		3:41
7.	"Living in Fear"		4:37
8.	"Shut Up"		4:12
9.	"Dope"		2:53
10.	"Love Conquers All"		4:30
11.	"Taxman"	George Harrison	3:51
Total length:			48:29

Note: the US release has "Power Trippin'" as track 4 and removes "Let's Get It On". It also has a dark blue sleeve in comparison to the pink European and Japanese releases.

=== Japan version ===
This edition features two bonus tracks, "Power Trippin'" and "Charanga", previously released on the "She Can Rock It" CD single.

All tracks are written by Robert Palmer, Andy Taylor, John Taylor & Tony Thompson, except where noted.

No.	Title	Writer(s)	Length
1.	"Notoriety"		5:06
2.	"Scared"		4:06
3.	"She Can Rock It"		4:16
4.	"Let's Get It On"	Gaye, Townsend	7:03
5.	"Life Forces"		4:08
6.	"Fancy That"		3:41
7.	"Living in Fear"		4:37
8.	"Shut Up"		4:12
9.	"Dope"		2:53
10.	"Love Conquers All"		4:30
11.	"Taxman"	Harrison	3:51
12.	"Charanga" (bonus track)		6:01
13.	"Power Trippin" (bonus track)		4:21
Total length:			58:51

== Personnel ==
The Power Station

- Robert Palmer – vocals, keyboards
- Andy Taylor – guitar
- Bernard Edwards – bass
- Tony Thompson – drums

Additional musicians

- José Rossy – percussion
- Wally Badarou – keyboards
- Philippe Saisse – keyboards
- Lenny Pickett – horns
- Earl Gardner – horns
- Alex Foster – horns
- Mark J. Suozzo – horns
- Joseph Gollehon – horns
