= Thunder (Andy Taylor album) =

Studio album by Andy Taylor
- Released: April 1987
- Recorded: 1986
- Studio: The Record Plant, Los Angeles
- Genre: Rock, hard rock, glam metal
- Length: 42:00
- Label: MCA
- Producer: Andy Taylor; Steve Jones

Andy Taylor chronology
| Thunder (1987) | Dangerous (1990) |

Singles from Introducing Lobo
- 1. "I Might Lie" Released: 1987; 2. "Don't Let Me Die Young" Released: 1987; 3. "Life Goes On" Released: 1987

Professional ratings
Review scores
| Source | Rating |
|---|---|
| AllMusic | 3/5 stars |
| Record Mirror | 3/5 stars |

Thunder is the debut solo album by British guitarist and former Duran Duran and Power Station member Andy Taylor, released in 1987 on MCA Records. It features former Sex Pistols guitarist Steve Jones on guitar.

The album peaked at No. 61 on the UK Albums Chart and No. 46 on the US Billboard 200. "I Might Lie" and "Don't Let Me Die Young" were top 40 hits on the Billboard Album Rock Tracks chart, peaking at No. 17 and No. 36, respectively.

The album went out of print in 1990 but reemerged in a newly expanded version on digital music retailers when Taylor made his entire catalog available in 2010. In addition to the original version of Thunder, Taylor's previous solo singles such as "Take It Easy" were included as well.

British hard rock band Thunder took their name in partial reference to this album.

== Track listing ==
All songs are written by Andy Taylor and Steve Jones, except where noted.

Thunder track listing
| No. | Title | Writer(s) | Length |
|---|---|---|---|
| 1. | "I Might Lie" | | 5:20 |
| 2. | "Don't Let Me Die Young" | | 4:23 |
| 3. | "Life Goes On" | | 4:53 |
| 4. | "Thunder" | | 4:03 |
| 5. | "Night Train" | | 4:40 |
| 6. | "Tremblin'" | | 4:30 |
| 7. | "Bringin' Me Down" | | 5:07 |
| 8. | "Broken Window" | Taylor | 4:11 |
| 9. | "French Guitar" | | 4:03 |

== Personnel ==
- Andy Taylor – lead vocals, guitars
- Steve Jones – guitars
- Mickey Curry – drums
- Patrick O'Hearn – bass guitar
- Brett Tuggle – keyboards
- Paulinho Da Costa – percussion
- Mark Volman – backing vocals
- Howard Kaylan – backing vocals

=== Production ===
- Producers: Andy Taylor, Steve Jones
- Engineer: George Tutko
- Mixer: Jeff Hendrickson
- Assistant engineer: Paul Wertheimer
- Mastering: Brian Gardner at Bernie Grundman Mastering, Hollywood, CA
- Photography: Jim Shea
- Art direction and design: Kosh

== Charts ==
=== Album ===
Chart performance for Thunder
| Chart (1987) | Peak position |
|---|---|
| Swedish Albums (Sverigetopplistan) | 31 |
| UK Albums Chart | 61 |
| US Billboard 200 | 46 |

=== Singles ===
Chart performance for singles from Thunder
| Year | Single | Chart | Position |
|---|---|---|---|
| 1987 | "I Might Lie" | US Billboard Album Rock Tracks | 17 |
| 1987 | "Life Goes On" | Italy Airplay (Music & Media) | 12 |
| 1987 | "Don't Let Me Die Young" | US Billboard Album Rock Tracks | 36 |
