= The Spanish Sessions EP =

The Spanish Sessions

EP by Andy Taylor and Luke Morley
- Released: 1999
- Genre: Rock
- Label: Independent
- Producer: Andy Taylor; Luke Morley

Andy Taylor chronology
| Dangerous (1990) | The Spanish Sessions (1999) | Man's a Wolf to Man (2023) |

Luke Morley chronology
| The Spanish Sessions (1999) | El Gringo Retro (2001) |

The Spanish Sessions is a 4-track EP independently released in 1999 by Andy Taylor and Luke Morley. The release came on the heels of a small UK tour in late 1999 billed as 'An Evening with Luke Morley and Andy Taylor'. The EP was the first release of new material from Taylor since 1990's Dangerous. Two of the songs ("Lightning" and "Sleeping with the Past") were sung by Taylor, the other two by Morley. All four songs written by Taylor/Morley. Backing vocals were by sisters Anna and Tara McDonald.

== Track listing ==
All tracks composed by Andy Taylor and Luke Morley.

1. "Quiet Life"
2. "Lightning"
3. "Can't Stop the Rain"
4. "Sleeping with the Past"

== Personnel ==
- Andy Taylor – lead vocals on "Lightning" and "Sleeping with the Past", guitar
- Luke Morley – lead vocals on "Quiet Life" and "Can't Stop the Rain", guitar, bass
- Gary "Harry" James – drums
- Benny Mathews – piano, organ
- The McDonald sisters (Anna and Tara McDonald) – backing vocals
