= Gela Nash-Taylor =

American fashion designer and former actress

- Born: Gela Jacobson; Corning, New York, US
- Education: Carnegie Mellon University
- Occupation: Fashion designer
- Known for: Co-founder, Juicy Couture
- Spouse(s): Chris Nash (divorced); John Taylor (m. 1999)
- Children: 2 (including Travis)

Gela Nash-Taylor (née Jacobson) is an American fashion designer and former actress. In 1984 she played the role of Marta in V: The Series. In 1997 she co-founded the Los Angeles-based clothing brand Juicy Couture with Pamela Skaist-Levy. In 2021 she co-founded apparel and cannabis brand Potent Goods with her son Travis.

== Early life ==
She graduated from Carnegie Mellon University in 1978 as a drama major.

== Personal life ==
She has been married to the musician John Taylor, bass guitarist in the pop group Duran Duran, since 1999. They live in Los Angeles, and at South Wraxall Manor, Wiltshire, England.
