= Dangerous (Andy Taylor album) =

Studio album by Andy Taylor
- Released: August 1990
- Recorded: Summer 1990
- Genre: Rock
- Length: 42:00
- Label: MCA
- Producer: Andy Taylor

Andy Taylor chronology
| Thunder (1987) | Dangerous (1990) | The Spanish Sessions EP (1999) |

Singles from Dangerous
- 1. "Lola" Released: 1990; 2. "Stone Cold Sober" Released: 1990

Dangerous is a 1990 cover album by English guitarist Andy Taylor, who is most famous for his work in the band Duran Duran. It was a follow-up to his earlier solo album Thunder. To date, it was his most recent studio album although he released a new material in 1999, titled The Spanish Sessions EP, a collaborative album with Luke Morley, chief songwriter and guitarist of the English hard rock band Thunder. It would be Taylor's last solo album until 2023's Man's a Wolf to Man.

== Background ==
Andy Taylor commented on the history behind the album in an interview with MelodicRock:

"It sort of one of those happy accidents. Somebody, a very well known band had this idea to do that and they wanted me to produce the album for them, doing this selection of their favourite covers. At the very last minute they pulled out. And I said to the label [A&M], I could do that.

The guys that managed me at the time went into overdrive – 'you can do that as well, because you know how much money they are going to pay you to do it?!' I thought, great, this is something everyone wants to do – an album of their favourite covers.

The reason things are so raw, was that within 3 days we were in the studio recording this thing and it was done in that sort of 'ok, let's rehearse them and beat the shit out of them and play them and move on and just play them as you would do if you were in high school playing a bunch of covers!' It was done in that very short space of time and raw, upfront way. We had a blast doing it!"

The album was not widely promoted and had only limited success. Taylor's popularity had dwindled since leaving Duran Duran in 1986 and this album struggled with sales because of it. The album didn't chart in either UK or US. However, two singles were lifted from the album: "Lola" (UK #60) and "Stone Cold Sober" (UK #94). Both singles were accompanied with all black and white videos.

Coincidentally, Duran Duran, the band Taylor left, would release a cover album in 1995 with Thank You, with mixed results.

Highlights include the bouncy album opener "Don't Believe a Word" originally performed by Thin Lizzy and "Mustang Sally" originally performed by Wilson Pickett in 1966.

Dangerous would not be officially available in the United States until 2010, when Taylor's complete catalog was available to online music services such as iTunes.

== Track listing ==
1. "Don't Believe a Word" (Phil Lynott) – 2:21
2. "Stone Cold Sober" (Rod Stewart, Steve Cropper) – 3:29
3. "Feel Like Making Love" (Mick Ralphs, Paul Rodgers) – 4:32
4. "Lola" (Raymond Douglas Davies) – 4:12
5. "Space Station No. 5" (Ronnie Montreux, Sammy Hagar) – 4:16
6. "Sympathy for the Devil" (Mick Jagger, Keith Richards) – 5:20
7. "Mustang Sally" (Wilson Pickett) – 4:15
8. "Violence" (Ian Hunter, Mick Ralphs) – 4:23
9. "Cocaine" (J. J. Cale) – 3:33
10. "Live Wire" (Angus Young, Bon Scott, Malcolm Young) – 5:29

== Personnel ==
- Andy Taylor – lead vocals, rhythm guitar, lead guitar
- Matthew Ashman – rhythm guitar
- Richard "Cass" Lewis – bass guitar
- Toby Chapman – piano, organ
- David Palmer – drums
- Luís Jardim – percussion
- Maggie Ryder – backing vocals
- Susie O'List – backing vocals
- Gary Barnacle – saxophone on "Mustang Sally"

== Singles ==
- "Lola" (Raymond Douglas Davies) b/w "Be Good to Yourself" (Andy Fraser) - UK No. 60
- "Stone Cold Sober" (Rod Stewart, Steve Cropper) b/w "Suffragette City" (David Bowie) and "Winner with You" (Jess Roden)
