= The Power Station (album) =

- CD edition cover art

Studio album by the Power Station
- Released: 25 March 1985
- Recorded: 1984
- Studios: Power Station, New York City
- Genre: Rock
- Length: 34:21
- Label: Capitol/EMI
- Producer: Bernard Edwards

The Power Station chronology
The Power Station (1985)	Living in Fear (1996)

Singles from The Power Station
- 1. "Some Like It Hot" Released: 4 March 1985; 2. "Get It On (Bang a Gong)" Released: 29 April 1985; 3. "Communication" Released: 28 October 1985

Professional ratings
Review scores
Source	Rating
AllMusic	4/5 stars
Robert Christgau	C+
Kerrang!	5/5 stars
Record Mirror	4/5 stars

The Power Station is the debut album by supergroup the Power Station, released in 1985 on Capitol Records. The album peaked at No. 6 on the US Billboard 200 and No. 12 on the UK Albums Chart. All three singles released from the album were Top 40 hits in the United States. An anniversary edition was released 21 February 2005, featuring seven bonus tracks, as well as a 35-minute DVD.

== Background ==
The Power Station was a supergroup formed by Robert Palmer, Tony Thompson (of Chic) and Andy and John Taylor from Duran Duran. They came together in 1984 to record a one-off album, as a respite from the relentless global touring and promotion of Duran Duran.

The original plan for this one-album project was for the three musicians (Taylor, Taylor and Thompson) to provide musical continuity to an album full of material, with a different singer performing on each track. Thus, after initial work in France, the trio laid down basic tracks together—six of which were cut at Maison Rouge Studios in London—without a vocalist yet nor any melodies or lyrics for the original songs. Those who were approached to sing included Mick Jagger, Billy Idol, Mars Williams (who eventually contributed brass to the album) and Richard Butler (of the Psychedelic Furs), and Mick Ronson.

The group then invited eclectic soul singer Robert Palmer to join for the album, sending a cassette of rough mixes to Palmer in Nassau for him to come up with some lyrics and ideas, eventually joining them in New York. He initially came to record vocals for the track "Communication". When he heard that they had recorded demos for "Get It On (Bang a Gong)", he asked to try out vocals on that one as well, and by the end of the day, the group knew that they had found that elusive chemistry which distinguishes successful bands. Before long, they had decided to record the entire album with Palmer.

However, the union was not to hold. By the time the band decided to take the 8-track set on the road, Palmer had left to record his solo album Riptide (which, likely because of the involvement of the Power Station participants Edwards, Thompson, and Andy Taylor, is very similar in sound to the Power Station album). He was replaced by Michael Des Barres (famed for co-writing Animotion's "Obsession").

During the promotion cycle for the album, EMI released three singles, including the cover of T. Rex's "Get It On". Versions of these three singles are now included among the bonus tracks on the 2005 re-release.

In addition, the re-release also includes the song "Somewhere, Somehow, Someone's Gonna Pay", the only known Power Station song featuring Michael Des Barres on lead vocals. The song was used for the end titles of the Arnold Schwarzenegger action film Commando and was titled "We Fight for Love".

To celebrate its 40th anniversary, the album is set to be reissued on 23 January 2026 in 4-CD and 2-LP formats. The 4-CD set includes a booklet containing a new interview with John Taylor and Andy Taylor with journalist John Earls. The set features a new remaster of the album, single remixes, raw instrumentals from the original recording sessions, the band's performance at Live Aid, and a previously unreleased live set from the Spectrum in Philadelphia, Pennsylvania, on 21 August 1985, remixed by Richard Whittaker.

== Title ==
While the actual name of the album is The Power Station, the specific formats were adopted as part of the name (similar to PiL's 1986 Album), thus The Power Station 33 1/3 vinyl album, and The Power Station CD on compact disc.

== Track listing ==
All tracks are written by Robert Palmer, Andy Taylor & John Taylor, except where noted.

Side one
No.	Title	Writer(s)	Length
1.	"Some Like It Hot"		5:05
2.	"Murderess"		4:17
3.	"Lonely Tonight"	Bernard Edwards; Palmer	3:58
4.	"Communication"	Derek Bramble; Palmer; A. Taylor; J. Taylor	3:37

Side two
No.	Title	Writer(s)	Length
1.	"Get It On (Bang a Gong)"	Marc Bolan	5:29
2.	"Go to Zero"	Guy Pratt; Palmer	4:58
3.	"Harvest for the World"	Isley Brothers	3:37
4.	"Still in Your Heart"		3:20
Total length:			34:21

2005 reissue bonus tracks
No.	Title	Writer(s)	Length
1.	"Someday, Somehow, Someone's Gotta Pay"		4:32
2.	"The Heat Is On"		3:18
3.	"Communication" (Long Remix)	Bramble; Palmer; A. Taylor; J. Taylor	4:39
4.	"Get It On (Bang a Gong)" (7")	Bolan	3:45
5.	"Some Like It Hot and the Heat Is On"		6:36
6.	"Communication" (Remix)		3:51
7.	"Some Like It Hot" (7")		3:44
Total length:			66:20

== Personnel ==
The Power Station

- Robert Palmer – lead and backing vocals
- Andy Taylor – guitars, co-lead vocals on "Harvest for the World"
- John Taylor – bass
- Tony Thompson – drums

Additional musicians

- Michael Des Barres – lead vocals on track 9
- Curtis King Jr, Fonzi Thornton, B.J. Nelson, Charmaine Burch – additional vocals
- Lenny Pickett, Mark Pender, Stan Harrison, "Hollywood" Paul Litteral, Mars Williams – brass
- Roger Taylor, Jimmy Bralower – percussive effects
- Wally Badarou, David LeBolt, Robert Sabino, Rupert Hine – keyboards

Production

- Produced by Bernard Edwards
- Recorded and Engineered by Jason Corsaro, Steve Rinkoff and Rob Eaton
- Mixed by Jason Corsaro
- Mastered by Howie Weinberg at Masterdisk, New York

== Charts ==
Chart (1985)	Peak position
Australia (Kent Music Report)	15
UK Albums (OCC)	12
US Billboard 200	6

Chart (2026)	Peak position
Hungarian Physical Albums (MAHASZ)	13
Japanese Albums (Oricon)	44
Japanese Rock Albums (Oricon)	4
Japanese Top Albums Sales (Billboard Japan)	43
