= Bradford Leigh =

Hamlet in Wiltshire, England

Coordinates: 51.362°N 2.231°W

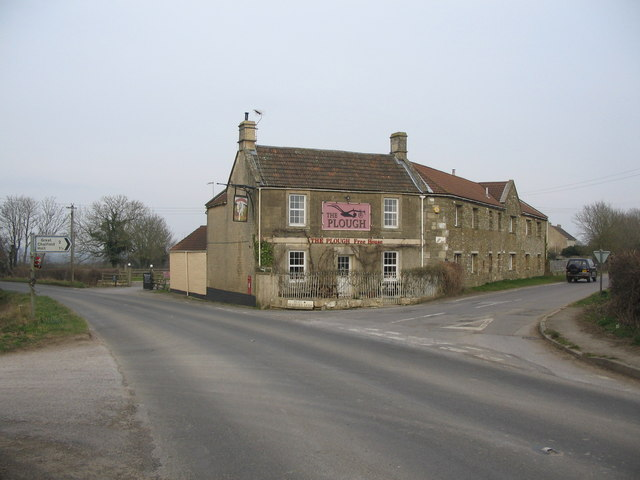
- The Plough, Bradford Leigh, 2006

- Location within Wiltshire
- OS grid reference: ST840626
- Civil parish: South Wraxall
- Unitary authority: Wiltshire
- Ceremonial county: Wiltshire
- Region: South West
- Country: England
- Sovereign state: United Kingdom
- Post town: Bradford on Avon
- Postcode district: BA15
- Dialling code: 01225
- Police: Wiltshire
- Fire: Dorset and Wiltshire
- Ambulance: South Western
- UK Parliament: Melksham and Devizes

Bradford Leigh is a hamlet in Wiltshire, England. It lies in the parish of South Wraxall, about 1.3 miles (2.1 km) northeast of the centre of the town of Bradford on Avon.

The area was formerly a tithing of the parish of Bradford on Avon. A Methodist chapel was built in 1892, belonging to the Methodist church at Bradford on Avon; the chapel closed in the mid-20th century.

The local pub, the Plough, closed in 2014 and was offered for sale in 2015.
