= Feelings Are Good and Other Lies =

Studio album by John Taylor
- Released: 1995
- Genres: Hard rock, alternative rock, punk rock
- Length: 45:30
- Label: B5
- Producer: Hein Hoven

John Taylor chronology
Feelings Are Good and Other Lies (1995)	Autodidact (EP) (1997)

Feelings Are Good and Other Lies is the debut solo album by English musician John Taylor. It was released online in 1995; patrons had to email an AOL address to purchase it. A physical release followed in 1997. The record label, B5 Records, was co-founded by John Taylor and the producer, Hein Hoven.

Two songs on the album, the title track and "Always Wrong", also appeared on Neurotic Outsiders, but are presented as re-recorded versions with Taylor only. Steve Jones contributed guitar to the album.

== Critical reception ==
Professional ratings
Review scores
Source	Rating
AllMusic	2.5/5 stars
MusicHound Rock: The Essential Album Guide	0/5 stars

Washington City Paper wrote that "although a proficient bass player, [Taylor]'s hardly a profound wordsmith."

== Track listing ==
All tracks composed by John Taylor

1. "Feelings R Good" – 3:03
2. "Don't Talk Much" - 3:37
3. "2:03" - 1:57
4. "Everyone Is Getting It But Me" - 4:11
5. "Always Wrong" - 3:07
6. "Look Homeward Angel" - 4:10
7. "Losing You" - 3:13
8. "See You Again" - 2:55
9. "Down Again" - 2:10
10. "Girl Raw" - 4:02
11. "Hole in the Mud" - 4:37
12. "Trust the Process" (5:15 / includes hidden track "Encore for Bean" 3:13) - 8:28

== Personnel ==
- Steve Jones
- David Palmer
- John Shanks
- Rick Boston
- John Amato
- Gerry Laffy
- Roy Hay

Technical

- Eric Ruffing - art direction, design
- Nick Egan - art direction
- Roger Mayne, Mario Sorrenti, Julie Verona - photography
