= Forever Young (Rod Stewart song) =

1988 single by Rod Stewart

Single by Rod Stewart

from the album Out of Order
- B-side: "Days Of Rage"
- Released: July 1988
- Genre: Soft rock
- Length: 4:06
- Label: Warner Bros. Records
- Songwriters: Jim Cregan, Kevin Savigar, Bob Dylan, Rod Stewart
- Producers: Rod Stewart, Andy Taylor

Rod Stewart singles chronology
| "Lost in You" (1988) | "Forever Young" (1988) | "My Heart Can't Tell You No" (1988) |

Music video
- "Forever Young" by Rod Stewart on YouTube

"Forever Young" is a song by British singer-songwriter Rod Stewart, first released on his 1988 album Out of Order. The song was a top 20 hit on the Billboard Hot 100, peaking at No. 12, and No. 9 on the Canadian RPM charts.

== Background ==
Stewart wrote the song with two band members: guitarist Jim Cregan and keyboardist Kevin Savigar. Stewart told Mojo magazine in 1995 that he considered "Forever Young" to be one of his favorite songs, and the reason for writing it was, "I love 'Forever Young' because that was a real heartfelt song about my kids. I suddenly realized I'd missed a good five years of Sean and Kimberly's life because I was so busy touring all the time. With these kids now I don't make that mistake -- I take them on tour with me, so I can watch them grow up. So that's another favorite. Unfortunately, it wasn't a big hit in England, but it's like a national anthem here [America]."

The structure of the lyrics in this song was similar enough to a Bob Dylan song of the same title that, after its completion, the song was then sent to Dylan, asking whether he had a problem with it. The two men agreed to participate in the ownership of the song and share Stewart's royalties.

In January 1989, immediately following the broadcast of Super Bowl XXIII, NBC Sports used "Forever Young" as the soundtrack for a year-in-review montage showcasing highlights from four events NBC had broadcast over the previous year: the 1988 Summer Olympics, the 1988 World Series, the 1989 Fiesta Bowl, and Super Bowl XXIII.

Stewart recorded a more mellow version of the song for his 1996 compilation album If We Fall in Love Tonight, and a version featuring just Stewart's voice with piano accompaniment can be found on the 2009 compilation album The Rod Stewart Sessions 1971-1998. A live version was recorded during his MTV Unplugged session in 1993. Though not included on the original release of the live album Unplugged...and Seated, this version was later released as a bonus track on the Collector's Edition of the album released by Rhino Records in 2009. Another live version of the song from his 2013 performance at The Troubadour, West Hollywood was included on the deluxe edition of the album Time.

== Music video ==
The video for this song features Stewart singing to a child, played by Alex Zuckerman, while scenes of rural America pass by. It was filmed on Potrero Road in Hidden Valley, Ventura County, California.

== Charts ==
=== Weekly charts ===
| Chart (1988) | Peak position |
|---|---|
| Canadian Singles Chart | 9 |
| Ireland (IRMA) | 41 |
| Italy Airplay (Music & Media) | 5 |
| South Africa (Springbok) | 3 |
| UK Singles (Official Charts Company) | 57 |
| US Billboard Hot 100 | 12 |
| US Billboard Hot Adult Contemporary | 3 |

=== Year-end charts ===
| Chart (1988) | Rank |
|---|---|
| Canada | 65 |
| U.S. (Joel Whitburn's Pop Annual) | 123 |

== Glee version ==
An acoustic version was performed by Matthew Morrison in the TV series Glee third-season finale episode "Goodbye".

In 2018, electronic alternative band City Vision released a version of "Forever Young", reinterpreting the song with a synth-driven arrangement.
