= Caroline Cossey =

English model and actress (born 1954)

- Born: 31 August 1954 (age 72); Brooke, Norfolk, England
- Other name: Tula
- Occupations: Model; actress; activist; author
- Spouses: Elias Fattal (m. 1989; annul. 1989) David Finch (m. 1992)
- Modelling information
- Height: 6 ft 0 in (1.83 m)
- Hair colour: Brown
- Eye colour: Green

Caroline Cossey (born 31 August 1954), also known as Tula, is a British model, actress, activist, and author. She appeared in the 1981 James Bond film For Your Eyes Only as an extra. Following her appearance in the film, she was outed as transgender by British tabloid News of the World. In 1991, she became the first trans woman to pose for Playboy. Cossey has since then fought for her right to legally marry and be legally recognized as a woman.

== Biography ==
=== Early life and transition ===
Cossey was born in Brooke, Norfolk, England and was assigned male at birth. Unbeknownst to Cossey and her family until later in her life, she was born with XXXY syndrome. In Cossey's autobiography My Story, she describes an unhappy childhood, where she suffered confusing feelings and bullying by peers due to her femininity. Growing up, Cossey's closest companion was her sister, Pam, with whom she played dress-up in their mother's clothes. Cossey left formal schooling when she was fifteen and found work in a clothing store and as a butcher's apprentice. At sixteen, she moved to London and worked at a variety of low-wage jobs.

Cossey started transitioning while working as an usherette in the West End of London. By seventeen, Cossey was receiving hormone therapy and working full-time as a showgirl. Following her breast augmentation surgery, Cossey worked as a showgirl in Paris and as a topless dancer in Rome, so she could save money for her sex reassignment surgery. After a few years of hormone therapy, Cossey had her final surgery on 31 December 1974, at Charing Cross Hospital, London. Doctors discovered her XXXY syndrome during pre-surgery testing, at age 20.

=== Modelling career ===
Cossey began an active social life as a woman, concealing her transition. Asked about her dating life, Cossey replied, "I'm afraid I went a little wild." She told tabloids she had a romance with the television presenter Des Lynam, though Lynam says he does not recall it. Lynam however mentions going on dates with her in his autobiography. Cossey worked as a model under the name "Tula". She appeared in top magazines such as Australian Vogue and Harper's Bazaar, and worked extensively as a glamour model. She was a Page Three Girl for the British tabloid The Sun and appeared in Playboy in 1991.

In 1978, Cossey won a part on the game show 3-2-1. A tabloid journalist then contacted her, revealing he had discovered she was transgender, and planned to write about it. Other journalists researched her past, attempting to interview her family members. Cossey dropped out of the show, convincing the producers to release her from her contract. After this incident, Cossey purposefully maintained a lower profile, accepting only smaller assignments.

=== Outing by the tabloid press ===
Cossey was cast as an extra in the 1981 James Bond film For Your Eyes Only. Shortly after the film's release, the tabloid News of the World came out with a front-page headline "James Bond Girl Was a Boy". By her own accounts, Cossey was so upset she contemplated suicide. However, she continued her modelling career by focusing, once again, on smaller assignments. Cossey then responded by releasing I Am a Woman, which was her first autobiography.

=== Continued career ===
In 1985, Cossey appeared in the videos for The Power Station's "Some Like It Hot" and "Get It On".

She was featured in the September 1991 issue of Playboy in the pictorial "The Transformation of Tula", as an acknowledged transgender person.

=== Autobiography ===
In 1991, Cossey released My Story, which was her second and final autobiography. In it, she gave details of her transition, her relationship with Fattal, and her unsuccessful battle with the European Court of Human Rights.

== Personal life ==
Cossey became engaged to Count Glauco Lasinio, an Italian advertising executive, who was the first man to date her knowing of her past. He encouraged her to petition for changes in the British law concerning transsexuals. The engagement ended, but her legal efforts continued for seven years, eventually reaching the European Court of Human Rights.

=== First marriage ===
Cossey met Elias Simon Fattal, a British Israeli property investor, in 1985, in London. Fattal, who suffered from polymyalgia rheumatica, was looking into alternative medicine to relieve his pain and was referred to Cossey, who was studying acupuncture. She was 31 and he was 43. They began a relationship and she kept that she was a transgender woman from him. After Fattal proposed to her in 1988, on Valentine's Day, Cossey came out to him and Fattal did not break off their engagement. In preparation for their married life together, Cossey converted to Judaism and the two discussed the possibility of using Cossey's sister as an egg donor. The two married on 21 May 1989, at the Liberal Jewish Synagogue in St John's Wood, London, in a ceremony performed by Rabbi David Goldberg, and honeymooned in Acapulco and Jamaica. They returned to England on 11 June 1989, unaware that News of the World, a British tabloid, had run an article about their marriage under the headline "Sex Change Page Three Girl Weds" while they were abroad. Cossey and Fattal hadn't told his immediate family members, who were Orthodox Jews from Iraq, she was transgender, fearing they would react badly to the news. According to Cossey, Fattal went to speak with his parents in person after they saw the article and she never heard from him again. Fattal's brother William called her to tell her the marriage was going to be annulled. Cossey received no alimony or assets from her relationship with Fattal.

=== Legal petitions ===
On 27 September 1990, the European Court of Human Rights overturned its prior decision, following a British government appeal. Subsequently, the right of transgender people in the United Kingdom to change their legal sex would not be granted until the Gender Recognition Act 2004. Following this and her annulment, Cossey returned to modelling, which she had given up four years earlier at Fattal's request she not work.

=== Second marriage ===
Cossey met her husband, David Finch, a Canadian engineer, in August 1991. The two crossed paths by chance when Finch got lost in London on his way to visit his grandmother in Coventry and stopped for lunch at Brent Cross Shopping Centre, where Cossey was waiting to meet with her lawyer. They kept in touch. In November 1991, Cossey flew to Montreal to meet Finch's family and during her visit, he proposed to her over dinner in Quebec. Though it was legal for transgender individuals to marry in Canada at the time, their engagement was of some interest from the press, with the Toronto Star penning a brief article in 1992 about them titled "A '90s odd couple: Montreal man to marry transsexual." They currently reside in Kennesaw, Georgia.

== Published works ==
Cossey has published two autobiographies:

- Caroline Cossey (1982). I Am a Woman. Sphere. ISBN 0-7221-0583-5.
- Caroline Cossey (1991). My Story. Faber and Faber. ISBN 0-571-16251-7.
