= Lost in You (Rod Stewart song) =

Single by Rod Stewart

from the album Out of Order
- B-side: "Almost Illegal"
- Released: April 1988 (US); 9 May 1988 (UK)
- Genre: Rock
- Length: 4:59 (album version); 4:20 (single version); 5:34 (extended version)
- Label: Warner Bros.
- Songwriters: Rod Stewart; Andy Taylor
- Producers: Rod Stewart; Andy Taylor; Bernard Edwards

Rod Stewart singles chronology
"Twistin' the Night Away" (1987)	"Lost in You" (1988)	"Forever Young" (1988)

Lost in You is a song by British singer Rod Stewart, released in 1988 as the lead single from his fifteenth studio album, Out of Order. It was written by Stewart (lyrics) and Andy Taylor (music), and produced by Stewart, Taylor and Bernard Edwards. "Lost in You" peaked at No. 12 on the US Billboard Hot 100 and No. 21 on the UK Singles Chart.

== Background ==
In the liner notes of Storyteller – The Complete Anthology: 1964–1990, Stewart said of the song: "It was a Wednesday evening and we'd been hard at it in the studio, coming up with nothing. I said to the assembled band that Wednesday evening was football practice night [and] asked Andy Taylor to experiment while I was gone and maybe have something when I returned at 11pm. ["Lost in You"] was the result."

== Music video ==
The song's music video was directed by Daniel Kleinman and Jonathan Kaplan, and produced by Daniel Stewart and Beth Broday for Limelight Productions. It received heavy rotation on MTV.

== Critical reception ==
Upon its release, Billboard described the song as a "straight-ahead rock item", adding "[Stewart] sounds as good as ever on a strong song with equally powerful production." Cash Box noted the "very nice chorus hook" and "very nice string parts in the chorus". They added that Stewart provided his "usual consistent performance, with a voice that was born to rock". Music & Media considered the song an "excellent rocker" with "a boiling production". Richard Lowe of Smash Hits described "Lost in You" as a "terrific rock record that sounds a teensy weensy bit U2-ish".

== Track listing ==
7-inch single

1. "Lost in You" – 4:20
2. "Almost Illegal" – 4:30

12-inch single

1. "Lost in You" (Extended Remix) – 5:34
2. "Lost in You" – 4:20
3. "Almost Illegal" – 4:30

Cassette single (US release)

1. "Lost in You" – 4:20
2. "Almost Illegal" – 4:30

CD single (German release)

1. "Lost in You" (Fade) – 4:20
2. "Almost Illegal" – 4:30
3. "Lost in You" (Extended Remix) – 5:34
4. "Baby Jane" – 4:42

CD single (US promo)

1. "Lost in You" (Edit) – 4:29
2. "Lost in You" (LP Version) – 4:57

== Personnel ==
Lost in You

- Rod Stewart – vocals
- Andy Taylor, Michael Landau – guitars
- Bob Glaub – bass
- David Lindley – mandolin
- Tony Thompson – drums
- Kelly Emberg – female vocals
- Bruce Miller – string arrangement

Almost Illegal

- Rod Stewart – vocals
- Andy Taylor – guitar
- Bob Glaub – bass
- David Lindley – fiddle
- Tony Brock – drums

Production

- Rod Stewart, Andy Taylor, Bernard Edwards – producers
- Bernard Edwards, Steve MacMillan – mixing
- Steve MacMillan, Jeff Hendrickson, David Tickle, Paul Wertheimer – engineers
- Alan Abrahamson – assistant engineer
- Bernard Edwards, Steven Rinkoff – extended remix of "Lost in You"

Other

- Randee St. Nicholas – photography
- Sharmen Liao – computer illustration

== Charts ==
Chart (1988)	Peak position
Australian Singles Chart	23
Belgian Singles Chart (Ultratop 50 Flanders)	32
Canada (RPM 100)	6
Dutch Singles Chart	34
German Singles Chart	25
Irish Singles Chart	14
Italian Singles Chart (FIMI)	16
Italy Airplay (Music & Media)	7
Swiss Singles Chart	30
UK Singles Chart (Official Charts Company)	21
US Billboard Album Rock Tracks	3
US Billboard Hot 100	12
