= Juicy Couture =

American clothing brand

- Type: Subsidiary
- Industry: Fashion
- Founded: 1997; 29 years ago in Pacoima, LA
- Founder: Pamela Skaist-Levy; Gela Nash-Taylor
- Headquarters: Arleta, Los Angeles, United States
- Products: Clothing accessories perfumes
- Revenue: $19.50M
- Number of employees: 160
- Parent: Authentic Brands Group
- Website: juicycouture.com

Juicy Couture is an American luxury casualwear and dress clothing brand based in Arleta, Los Angeles, California. Best known for their velour tracksuits which became a luxury staple in the 2000s, the company was founded by Pamela Skaist-Levy and Gela Nash-Taylor in 1997 and was later purchased by the Liz Claiborne fashion company in 2003. Juicy Couture has turned into a global seller with their velour tracksuits and other fashions that span clothing, denim, handbags, shoes, intimates, swimwear, fragrance (the most famous are the eponymous Juicy Couture and Viva La Juicy), accessories, sunglasses, yoga, petwear, and babywear.

== History ==
Juicy Couture was started by two friends in 1997. Gela Nash (before marrying Duran Duran's John Taylor) and Pamela Skaist-Levy (while married to filmmaker Jefery Levy), both residing in Pacoima, California, decided to create their own fashion label, Travis Jeans, in 1989 selling maternity pants. In 1996 they changed the name to Juicy Couture.

All Juicy Couture items are manufactured with the company signature logo: two scottish terriers holding a shield bearing three hearts and Love P&G (for Pamela and Gela). A crown lies on top along with a Juicy Couture flowing banner. Following this, the brand Juicy Couture has had multiple revisions of their signature tag, such as the most well known square tag with the dogs on it, along with their newer tags. Juicy Couture has multiple different colored tags that correspond to different articles of clothing.

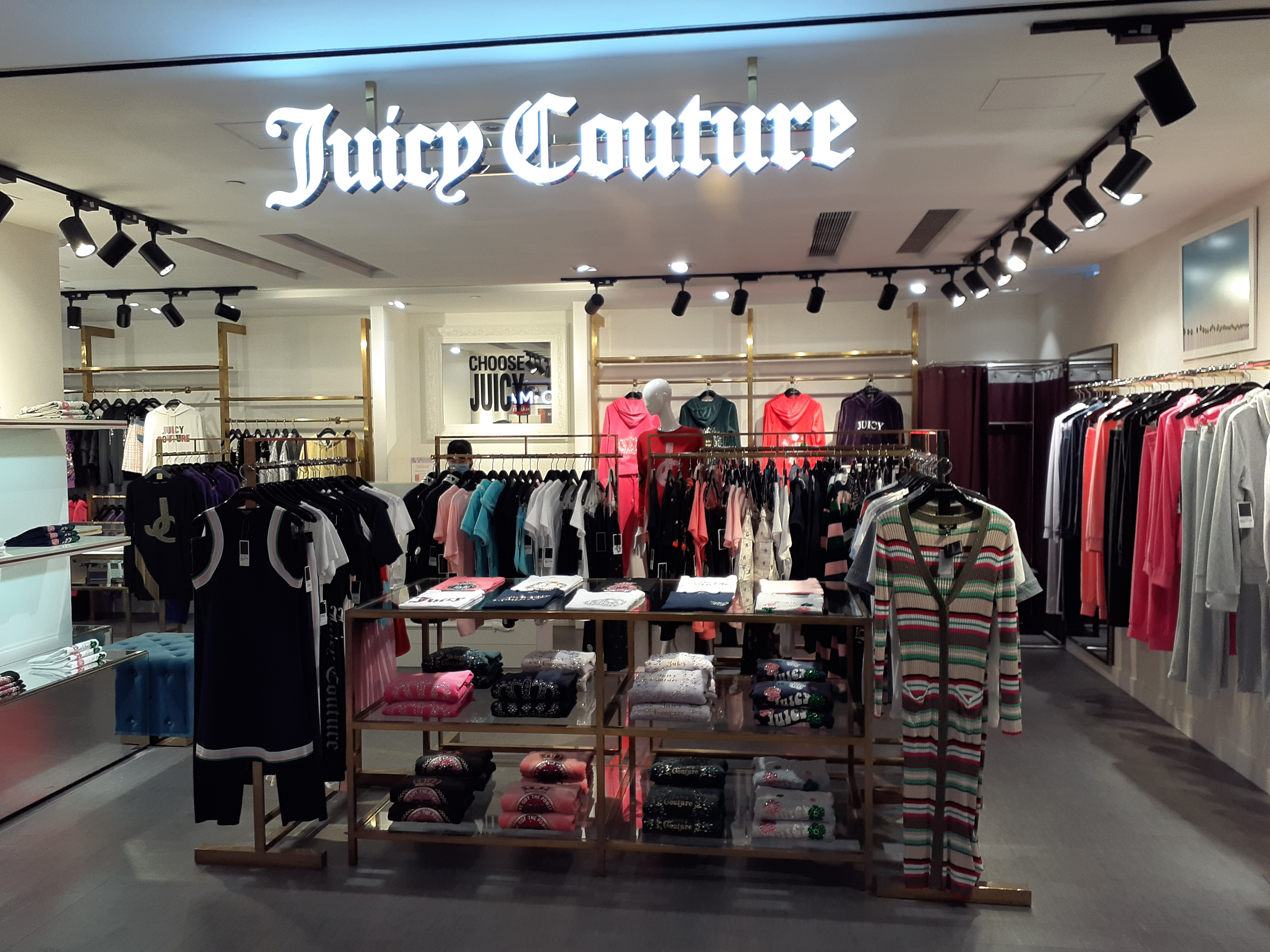
Juicy Couture shop in Hong Kong

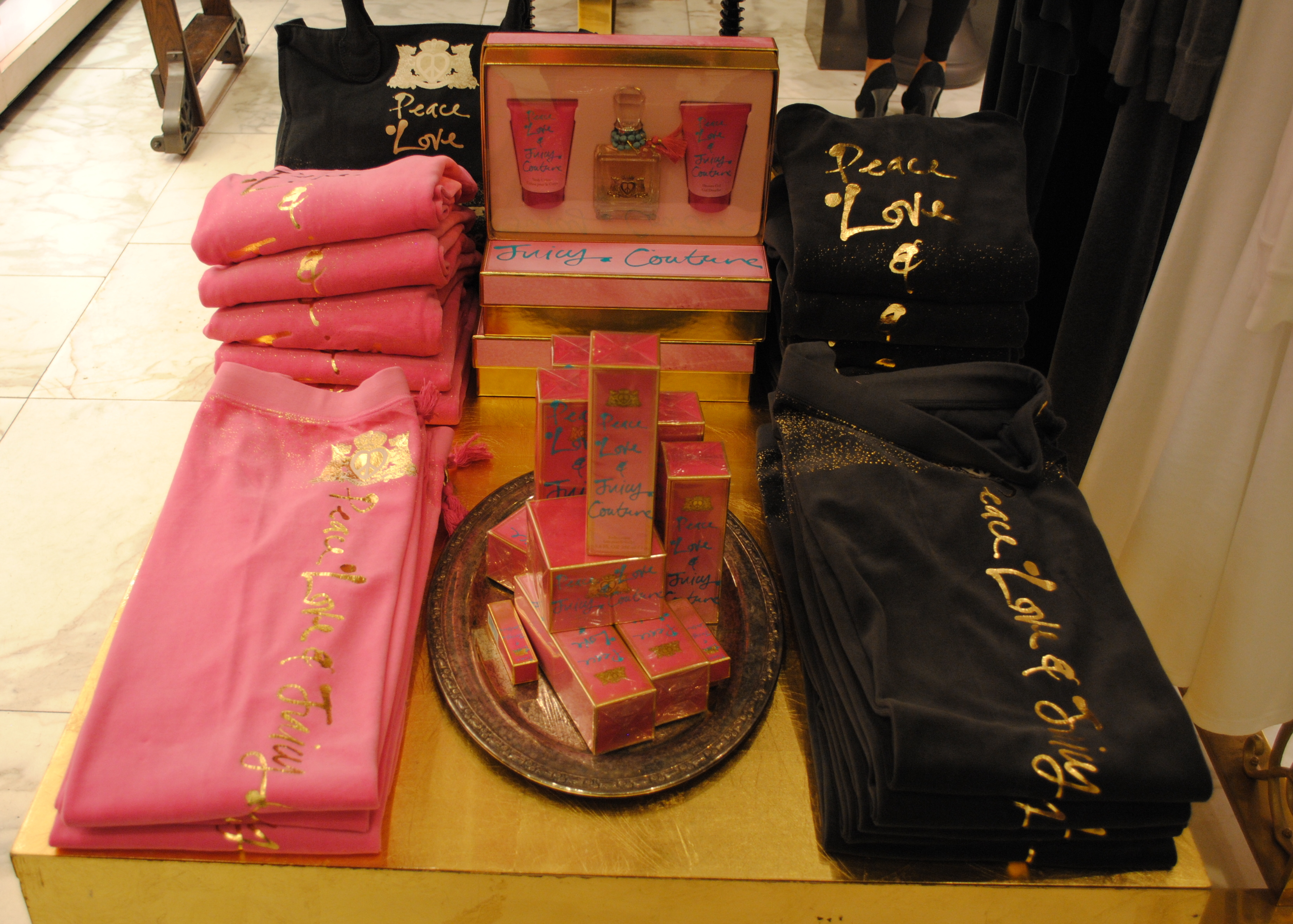
Juicy Couture display

From 1996, after establishing their company and needing to get public attention for the brand, Nash and Levy started to send their completed designs to celebrities. In 2001, the famous Juicy tracksuit was introduced and custom designed for Madonna; who turned the velour tracksuit into a trend. The public appearance of clothes worn by celebrities made the brand famous almost instantly. Madonna was the first big breakthrough celebrity endorsement for the company. Later, in 2004, the velour tracksuit once again became very popular among celebrities such as Jennifer Lopez, Britney Spears, and Paris Hilton. Juicy Couture then became a brand known around the world for the image of being the outfit of the "new money". Juicy Couture was a limited brand being available at few locations until the late 2000s.

In 2003 formerly Liz Claiborne Inc. (later known as Fifth & Pacific Companies, Inc.) acquired the company.

On November 1, 2010, LeAnn Nealz was named president and chief creative officer. In this position, she would be responsible for all creative elements of the business including product design of the items, marketing, and store design and reporting to the chief executive officer of Juicy Couture. Former Vogue accessories director Michelle Sanders was also hired to handle new licenses for jewelry, handbags, and swimwear.

An informed "guesstimate" put Juicy sales at about $200 million in one year. Vogue noted the company's growing – even exploding – popularity, saying, "The time may have come when Seventh Avenue's lofty vantage point suddenly seems less relevant than the ground-level perspective of the designer as consumer."

=== Sale ===
On October 7, 2013, Fifth & Pacific, Inc. announced that they would sell Juicy Couture to Authentic Brands Group for $195 million. In June 2014, the company was reported to be closing all its stores in the United States, with the closure expected by the end of June 2015. The company's 60 international stores would remain operating. In September 2014, Juicy Couture began being sold in Kohl's in the United States. In 2021, JCPenney began selling Juicy by Juicy Couture.

== Resurgence ==
In October 2025, Juicy Couture named Angel Reese as their global ambassador and creative collaborator. They launched a signature apparel collection, Angel Couture, co-designed by Reese. She became the face of their fragrance Viva La Juicy.
