= Some Like It Hot (song) =

1985 single by the Power Station

Single by the Power Station

from the album The Power Station
- B-side: "The Heat Is On"
- Released: 3 March 1985
- Recorded: 1984
- Studio: Power Station (New York City)
- Genre: Funk rock; hard rock
- Length: 5:05 (LP version); 3:43 (7-inch version)
- Label: Parlophone; Capitol
- Songwriters: Andy Taylor; John Taylor; Robert Palmer
- Producer: Bernard Edwards

The Power Station singles chronology
"Some Like It Hot" (1985)	"Get It On (Bang a Gong)" (1985)

Music video
- "Some Like It Hot" on YouTube

"Some Like It Hot" is a song by British-American band the Power Station. It was the first single released from the group's 1985 eponymous debut album. Released by Parlophone in March 1985, the song features loud, prominent drum beats from Tony Thompson and lead vocals from Robert Palmer. The video featured model Caroline Cossey (also known as Tula). It became the band's biggest hit, peaking at number six on the US Billboard Hot 100 chart and number four in Australia.

== Background ==
Bassist John Taylor said on the creation of the song: "What we really wanted to do was put this drummer out there in a way that we felt he deserved, so that song particularly was sort of designed to really showcase Tony. I flew to Nassau in the Bahamas, which was where Robert Palmer lived at the time, and played him the demo that Andy and I had written and said, 'We've got this idea that we're calling "Some Like It Hot".' And he just looked at me and said, 'And some sweat when the heat is on.' I was, like, 'Yes! That'll do...'"

The Power Station were living a lavish, drug-fueled lifestyle during the recording of the album, which made focusing difficult. "I had to be, like, strapped to the desk if I was gonna get a bass line finished, because I was just all over the place," John Taylor said.

== Track listings ==
UK and US 7-inch single

1. "Some Like It Hot" – 3:45
2. "The Heat Is On" – 3:20

UK and US 12-inch single

1. "Some Like It Hot and the Heat Is On" – 6:36
2. "Some Like It Hot" – 3:45
3. "The Heat Is On" – 3:20
- Also released as a 12-inch picture disc in the UK

== Charts ==
=== Weekly charts ===
Chart (1985)	Peak position
Australia (Kent Music Report)	4
Austria (Ö3 Austria Top 40)	10
Belgium (Ultratop 50 Flanders)	6
Canada Top Singles (RPM)	9
Europe (European Hot 100 Singles)	9
Ireland (IRMA)	15
Japan (Oricon)	98
Netherlands (Dutch Top 40)	15
Netherlands (Single Top 100)	9
New Zealand (Recorded Music NZ)	8
South Africa (Springbok Radio)	10
Switzerland (Schweizer Hitparade)	13
UK Singles (Official Charts)	14
US Billboard Hot 100	6
US Hot Dance/Disco Club Play (Billboard)	17
West Germany (GfK)	16

=== Year-end charts ===
Chart (1985)	Position
Australia (Kent Music Report)	40
Canada Top Singles (RPM)	80
Netherlands (Dutch Top 40)	95
Netherlands (Single Top 100)	89
US Billboard Hot 100	79

== In popular culture ==
"Some Like It Hot" was used for CBS Daytime advertising campaigns in 1985 and 2022.
