= Don't Let Me Die Young =

1987 single by Andy Taylor

Single by Andy Taylor

from the album Thunder
- B-side: "Falling"
- Released: 1987
- Recorded: 1986
- Genre: Hard rock
- Length: 4:23
- Label: MCA Records
- Songwriter(s): Andy Taylor; Steve Jones
- Producer(s): Andy Taylor; Steve Jones

Andy Taylor singles chronology
"I Might Lie" (1987)	"Don't Let Me Die Young" (1987)	"Lola" (1990)

"Don't Let Me Die Young" is a song by former Duran Duran member Andy Taylor. It was released in 1987 as a single from his album Thunder.

== Music video ==
The video shows an at-risk youth roaming around at night, observing various incidents about drugs, fast cars and crime, as well as Andy Taylor and his band performing.

== Chart performance ==
Chart (1987)	Peak position
US Billboard Album Rock Tracks	36
