= Quiet Frame; Wild Light =

Studio album by Golden Youth
- Released: May 28, 2013
- Label: Slospeak Records

Quiet Frame; Wild Light is the debut studio album by American indie/alternative band Golden Youth. It was released on May 28, 2013 through Slospeak Records.

== Critical reception ==
Quiet Frame; Wild Light received positive reviews overall. Gregory Robson of absolutepunk.net says "the sheer simplicity and beauty of Quiet Frame, Wild Light should be enough to vault Golden Youth out of Northern California and on to the national landscape." Paul W. of Plugged in Promotions begins his review by stating "this is the kind of debut album that will really get people’s attention." Live Simister gives the album high praise simply stating "there is a quality to it that every record should have and I find myself thoroughly impressed with it."

== Track listing ==
No.	Title	Length
1.	"Life Through a Keyhole"	1:36
2.	"We Are Alive"	3:41
3.	"Brother in the Morning Light"	4:10
4.	"You"	3:11
5.	"Seven Seas"	4:05
6.	"I Was a Lark"	3:53
7.	"On Wings"	4:42
8.	"Seven Seas (Piano Version)"	3:47
9.	"Brother in the Morning Light (Live)"	3:59
10.	"On Wings (Live)"	5:19
Total length:		38:23
