= Get It On (T. Rex song) =

1971 single by T.Rex

Single by T. Rex

from the album Electric Warrior
- B-side: "There Was a Time"; "Raw Ramp"
- Released: 2 July 1971
- Genre: Glam rock; boogie rock; rock and roll; blues rock
- Length: 4:25
- Label: Fly (UK); Reprise (US)
- Songwriter: Marc Bolan
- Producer: Tony Visconti

T. Rex singles chronology
"Hot Love" (1971)	"Get It On" (1971)	"Jeepster" (1971)

Audio
- "Get It On" on YouTube

"Get It On" is a song by English rock band T. Rex, featured on their 1971 album Electric Warrior. Written by frontman Marc Bolan, "Get It On" was the second chart-topper for T. Rex on the UK Singles Chart. In North America, it was retitled "Bang a Gong (Get It On)" to avoid confusion with a song of the same name by the group Chase.

== History ==
Following the success of T. Rex's single, "Hot Love", the band went on a United States tour. While in New York in March 1971, Bolan asked drummer Bill Legend to help him brainstorm drum patterns for a song idea that would later become "Get It On". Bolan claimed to have written the song out of his desire to record Chuck Berry's "Little Queenie", and said that the riff was taken from the Berry tune. In fact, a slightly edited line (And meanwhile, I'm still thinking) from "Little Queenie" is delivered during the fade of "Get It On". According to producer Tony Visconti, this line was an unscripted ad-lib by Bolan during recording.

This was the song that virtually ended the once-solid friendship between Bolan and John Peel, after Peel made clear his lack of enthusiasm for it on air after playing his advance white label copy. Bolan and Peel spoke only once more before the former's death in 1977.

The track was recorded at Trident Studios, London, and the piano on the record was performed by either Rick Wakeman or Blue Weaver. Mark Paytress notes that both pianists may have played separate parts on the song, with Wakeman contributing only the piano glissandos that feature several times throughout the song. Wakeman, who was desperate for work at the time to pay his rent, had bumped into Bolan in Oxford Street, who offered him the session. Wakeman pointed out to Tony Visconti that the record did not actually need a piano player. Visconti suggested that he could add a gliss. Wakeman said that Visconti could do that, to which Bolan replied, "You want your rent, don't you?" Wakeman did, and earned £9 (equivalent to £110 in 2025) for his efforts.

Saxophones were played by Ian McDonald of King Crimson. Producer Visconti later recalled: "He played all the saxes, one baritone and two altos. I kept the baritone separate but bounced the altos to one track. I bounced the backup vocals to two tracks, making an interesting stereo image." Mark Volman and Howard Kaylan (formerly The Turtles) provided back up vocals.

During a performance of Top of the Pops in December 1971, Elton John mimed playing a piano on the song.

== Track listing and catalogue details ==
1. "Get It On" (Marc Bolan) – 4:25
2. "There Was a Time" (Marc Bolan) – 1:00
3. "Raw Ramp" (Marc Bolan) – 4:14
- US: Reprise / 1032
- UK: Fly / BUG 10
- Germany: Ariola / 10 327 AT
- Denmark: Stateside / 6E 006-92700
- France: Columbia / CBS 7393 (without "There Was a Time")

== Personnel ==
=== T. Rex ===
- Marc Bolan – lead vocals, guitar
- Rick Wakeman – piano, Hammond organ
- Ian McDonald – baritone and alto saxophones
- Steve Currie – bass
- Bill Legend – drums, tambourine
- Mark Volman, Howard Kaylan – backing vocals

== Chart performance ==
It spent four weeks at the top in the UK, starting 24 July 1971 ("Hot Love" was number one for six weeks from March to May), and it was the group's biggest hit overall, with Bolan claiming that it sold a million. It peaked on the US Billboard Hot 100 chart at number 10 and at number 12 in the Cash Box Top 100 in March 1972, becoming the band's only major US hit. The song reached number 12 in Canada in March 1972.

=== Weekly charts ===
Chart (1971–1972)	Peak position
UK Singles Chart	1
Australian Singles Chart	14
Canadian RPM Top Singles	12
German GfK chart	3
Dutch Top 40	15
Irish Singles Chart	1
Norwegian Singles Chart	6
Swiss Singles Chart	3
US Billboard Hot 100	10
US Cash Box Top 100	12

=== Year-end charts ===
Chart (1971)	Rank
Australia	89
UK	11

Chart (1972)	Rank
US Billboard Hot 100	56
US Cash Box	58

== Certifications ==
Region	Certification	Certified units/sales
United Kingdom (BPI)	Platinum	600,000^{‡}
^{‡} Sales+streaming figures based on certification alone.

== The Power Station version ==
"Get It On"

Single by the Power Station

from the album The Power Station
- B-side: "Go to Zero"
- Released: 29 April 1985
- Recorded: 1984
- Studio: Power Station, New York City
- Genre: Hard rock
- Length: 5:31 (LP version); 3:43 (45 mix)
- Label: Parlophone; Capitol
- Songwriter: Marc Bolan
- Producer: Bernard Edwards

The Power Station singles chronology
"Some Like It Hot" (1985)	"Get It On" (1985)	"Communication" (1985)

Music video
- "Get It On (Bang a Gong)" on YouTube

"Get It On" was covered by the Power Station in 1985. Their version – referred to as "Get It On (Bang a Gong)" in the US – was released as the second single from their debut album. The track was a strong hit on the US Billboard Hot 100 chart, where the single peaked at number nine (one place higher than the original) in the summer of 1985. Meanwhile, in the UK, the song reached number 22 on the UK Singles Chart.

The band was originally going to have a different guest vocalist on each song on their album and had brought in Robert Palmer first to sing a different song. When Palmer heard that the band had recorded a demo of "Get It On", he asked to try out vocals for it also. Afterward, the band then decided to record the entire album with Palmer. Model Caroline Cossey, who had featured in their previous video for "Some Like It Hot", appeared again, alongside American dancer/singer-songwriter Sara Carlson.

On 13 July 1985, the Power Station, as well as Duran Duran, participated in the Live Aid Philadelphia concert and performed the song with British singer Michael Des Barres on vocals. The band, again with Des Barres on vocals, performed it in a cameo on the Miami Vice episode "Whatever Works".

=== Track listings ===
==== 7" vinyl single ====
- US: Capitol / B-5479
- UK: Parlophone / R 6096
- Australia: EMI / A1510
- Europe: EMI / 20 0632 7

Side one
No.	Title	Writer(s)	Length
1.	"Get It On"	Marc Bolan	3:43

Side two
No.	Title	Writer(s)	Length
1.	"Go to Zero"	Guy Pratt, Robert Palmer	4:57

==== 12" vinyl single ====
- US: Capitol / V8646
- UK: Parlophone / 12R 6096
- Europe: Parlophone / 1C K 060 20 0631 6
- Canada: Capitol / V 75107

Side one
No.	Title	Writer(s)	Length
1.	"Get It On" (LP version)	Bolan	5:31

Side two
No.	Title	Writer(s)	Length
1.	"Get It On" (45 mix)	Bolan	3:43
2.	"Go to Zero"	Pratt, Palmer	4:57

=== Charts ===
Chart (1985)	Peak position
Australia (Kent Music Report)	8
US Billboard Hot 100	9
US Billboard Top Rock Tracks	19
US Billboard Hot Dance Music/Maxi-Singles Sales	47
Irish Singles Chart	12
UK Singles Chart	22

== Other cover versions ==
- Blondie recorded a live version of the song on 4 November 1978 at The Paradise Ballroom in Boston, Massachusetts, which can be found on the 2001 reissue of Parallel Lines.
- In 1979, studio disco group Witch Queen released a disco version of the song, titled "Bang a Gong". It peaked at number 8 on the disco charts, and crossed over to the US Hot 100, peaking at number 68.
- In 2020, U2 covered the song with Elton John on piano.
- In 2023, Australian band Icehouse covered the song with the Scottish rock band Simple Minds.

== Sampling and references ==
British dance act Bus Stop (known in the US as "London Bus Stop") sampled the vocals from the T. Rex original in their 2000 pseudo-cover of the song, which charted at No. 59 in the UK.

English rock band Def Leppard named their twelfth studio album, Diamond Star Halos, after a line in the song.

== See also ==
- "Cigarettes & Alcohol"
- List of 1970s one-hit wonders in the United States
