= John Taylor (bass guitarist) =

British bassist and member of Duran Duran (born 1960)

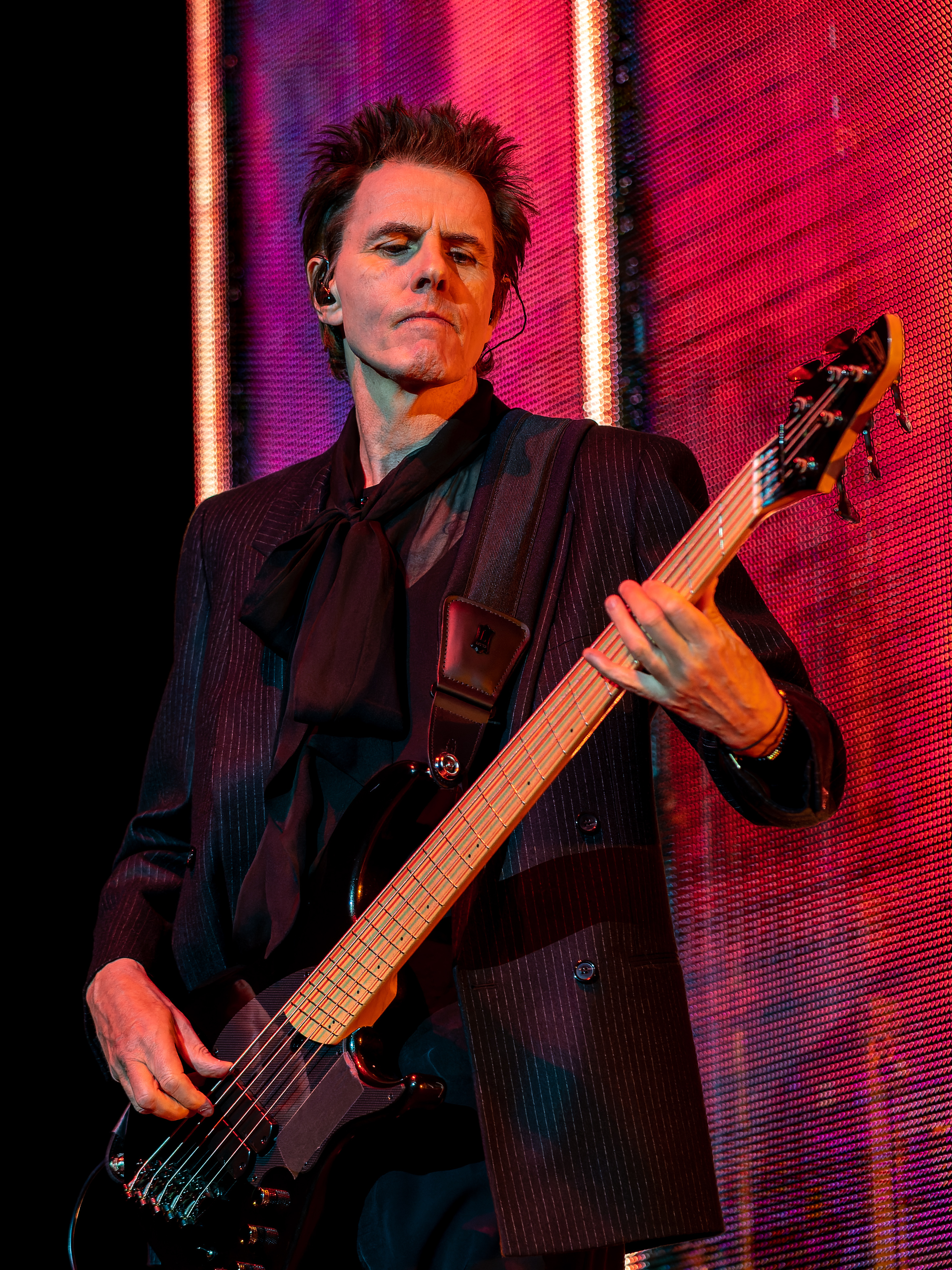
- Taylor performing at the O2 Arena in 2023

Background information
- Also known as: J.T., Tigger (1980s nickname), Mr. Long Legs, Jet Set
- Born: Nigel John Taylor; 20 June 1960 (age 66); Solihull, Warwickshire, England
- Origin: Birmingham, England
- Genres: New wave; new romantic; pop rock; hard rock; heavy metal
- Occupation: Bassist
- Years active: 1978–present
- Member of: Duran Duran
- Formerly of: The Power Station; Neurotic Outsiders
- Spouses: Amanda de Cadenet (m. 1991; sep. 1995); Gela Nash (m. 1999)
- Partner: Renée Simonsen (1985–1989)
- Website: duranduran.com

Nigel John Taylor (born 20 June 1960) is a British musician who is best known as the bass guitarist for the new wave band Duran Duran, of which he is a founding member. Duran Duran was one of the most popular bands in the world during the 1980s due in part to their music videos which played in heavy rotation in the early days of MTV. Taylor played with Duran Duran from 1978 until 1997 when he left to pursue a solo music and film career. He recorded a dozen solo releases (albums, EPs, and video projects) through his private record label B5 Records over the next four years, had a lead role in the movie Sugar Town, and made appearances in a half dozen other film projects. He rejoined Duran Duran for a reunion of the original five members in 2001 and has remained with the group since.

Taylor was also a member of two supergroups: the Power Station and Neurotic Outsiders.

== Early life ==
Born in Solihull, which was then in Warwickshire, John Taylor grew up in nearby Hollywood, Worcestershire, England. As a child, he attended Our Lady of the Wayside Catholic School and the Abbey High School, in Redditch, wore glasses (due to severe myopia, over -10 dioptres), enjoyed James Bond films and was interested in the hobby of wargaming with hand-painted model soldiers. In his early teen years, he discovered music, choosing Roxy Music as his favourite band, and before long was collecting records and teaching himself to play the piano. His first band was called Shock Treatment.

== Career ==
=== 1978–1997: Duran Duran and the Power Station ===
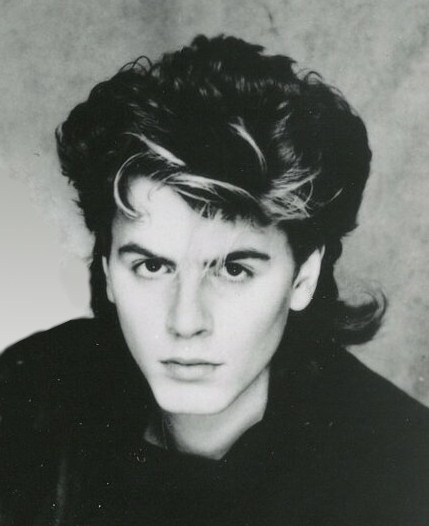
John Taylor. - Duran Duran 1983.

In 1978, Taylor and school friend Nick Rhodes formed Duran Duran with Stephen Duffy while attending the School of Foundation Studies & Experimental Workshop at Birmingham Polytechnic (now Birmingham City University). Soon after, Taylor underwent an "ugly duckling" transformation—ditching the glasses for contact lenses, adopting the ruffles and sashes of the fashion that would become known as the New Romantic style, and learning to wear eyeliner and lipstick. He stopped using the name "Nigel", and has been known throughout his professional career as John Taylor.

Taylor played guitar when Duran Duran was founded, but switched to bass guitar after discovering the funky rhythms of Chic, and learned to enjoy playing in the rhythm section with Duran's newly recruited drummer Roger Taylor. He has frequently cited Chic's Bernard Edwards and the Clash's Paul Simonon as his strongest influences, in addition to Paul McCartney, James Jamerson, and Roxy Music players Graham Simpson and John Porter. Duran Duran released their first album in 1981, and went on to worldwide success in the early 1980s.

In 1985, after recording the theme song to the Bond movie A View to a Kill, Duran Duran split into two side projects. John Taylor and guitarist Andy Taylor joined forces with former Chic drummer Tony Thompson and Robert Palmer, who earlier met at Duran Duran's charity concert at Villa Park 1983, to form the band the Power Station. With the guidance of producer Bernard Edwards, they released one album, The Power Station, which produced the hit singles "Some Like It Hot" and the T. Rex song "Bang a Gong (Get It On)". That year, Taylor also launched his first solo effort, recording the single "I Do What I Do..." for the soundtrack to the movie 9½ Weeks starring Kim Basinger. He also wrote some instrumental music for the movie's score with collaborator Jonathan Elias.

When Andy and Roger Taylor left the band, the three remaining members reformed Duran Duran for the 1986 Notorious album, and continued to record and tour throughout the 1990s with new guitarist Warren Cuccurullo.

On 24 December 1991, Taylor married Amanda de Cadenet, who was already pregnant with his daughter Atlanta (born 31 March 1992). He moved from England to Los Angeles to help further his wife's acting career, as well as to escape constant attention from the British tabloids. Taylor's marriage declined even as Duran Duran's star rose with the success of 1993's Duran Duran, also known as The Wedding Album. He and de Cadenet separated in May 1995.

Duran Duran's success rapidly waned with the widely derided 1995 covers album Thank You. Following that album's supporting tour, Duran Duran spent part of the summer of 1995 in London working on the album Medazzaland. Concurrently, Taylor devoted time to the side project Neurotic Outsiders, recording and touring with that band from the end of 1995 through the start of 1996.

=== 1997–2001: Solo music career ===
In January 1997, Taylor announced at a Duran Duran fan convention that he was leaving the band.

During 1997 and 1998, Taylor built and toured with a band called "John Taylor Terroristen" (Gerry Laffy on guitar, Michael Railton/Tio Banks on keyboard, Larry Aberman on drums, John Amato on sax and flute) which played numerous shows in Southern California before touring the East and West Coasts of the United States. Terroristen released a live EP 5.30.98 and the accompanying video Better Off Alive through the Trust The Process website. After 9/11, Taylor said he would never use the band name "Terroristen" again.

Taylor also began making forays into acting. His long friendship with Allison Anders led to a starring role in her independent film, Sugar Town, in 1998. He also appeared in small roles in several other movies and TV programmes over the next couple of years.

In 1999, Taylor released two albums of earlier material. The first, Résumé, was made up of unreleased music that he and Jonathan Elias had worked on together during the 1985 sessions for the 9½ Weeks movie soundtrack. The second, Meltdown, was a collection of tracks Taylor had laid down in 1992, during the extensive delays in Duran Duran's recording of The Wedding Album.

Later in 1999 Taylor signed a recording contract with the Japanese record label Avex Trax, and released an album labelled simply John Taylor on the cover, but listed in his official discography as The Japan Album. He continued recording for Avex in 2000, and early in 2001 released Techno for Two (featuring the international hit "6,000 Miles" co-written by Matthew Hager), a decidedly non-techno album filled with very personal songs. Shortly after, as talks began for a potential Duran Duran reunion, Taylor decided to create a retrospective package called Retreat into Art demonstrating his development over the previous five years.

Taylor's final solo release, completed after the Duran Duran reunion was under way, was the collection MetaFour released in 2002. It features a 17-minute Q&A interview with fellow bass player Christopher Maloney at Musicians Institute in Hollywood, California.

In October 2012, Taylor released an autobiography called In the Pleasure Groove: Love, Death and Duran Duran. In 2013, the Writers in Treatment organisation awarded Taylor with the "Experience, Strength and Hope" award for his work.

=== 2001–present: Duran Duran reunion ===
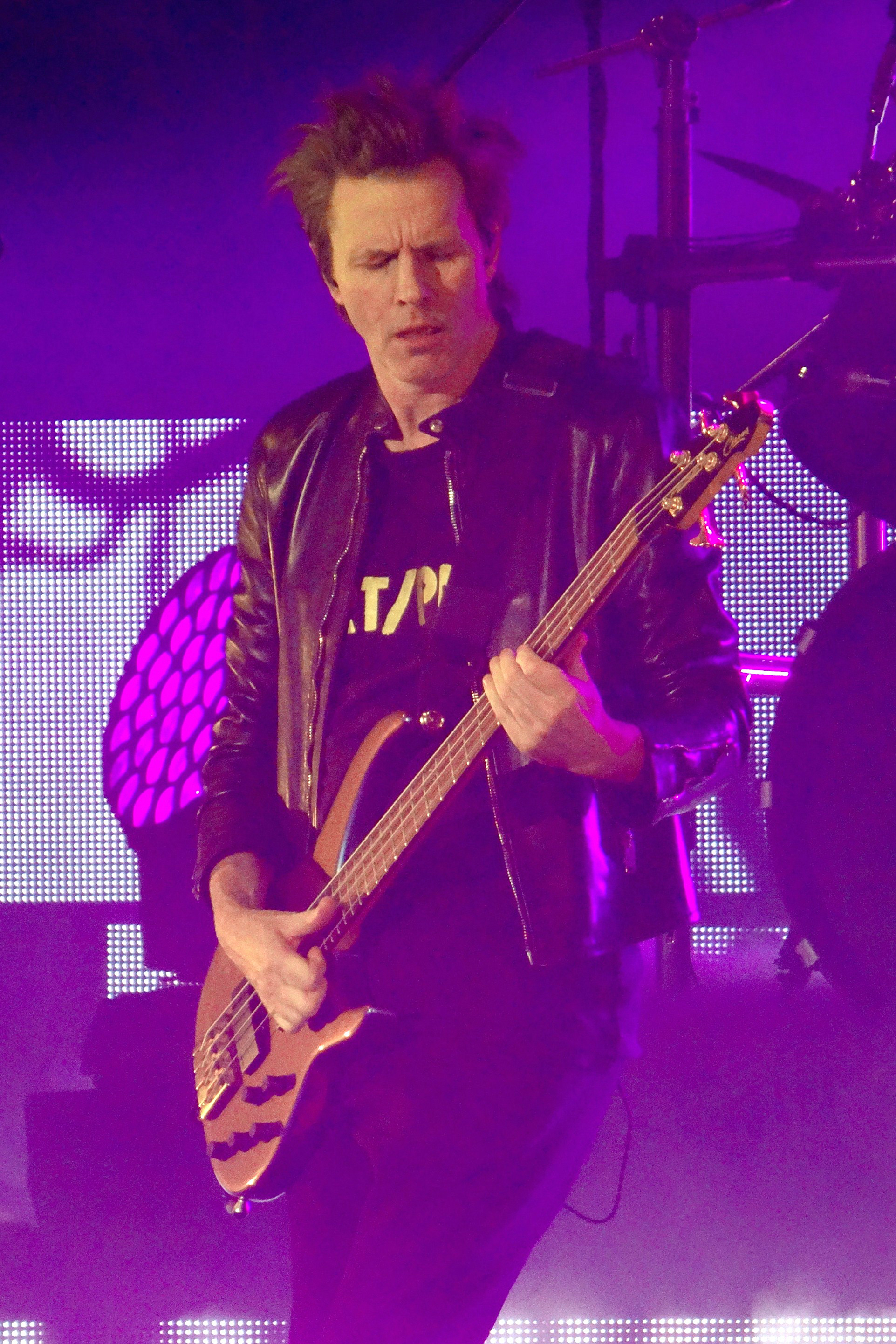
Taylor performing in 2015

In 2000, Taylor was approached at his home in Los Angeles by singer Simon Le Bon about a possible reunion with the original Duran Duran lineup, and he was enthusiastic about the idea as long as the other Taylors (Roger and Andy, who had left the band in 1986) were willing to rejoin as well. An agreement was soon reached, and Taylor demonstrated his renewed commitment to the band by getting an enormous linked-D's tattoo on the upper side of his right arm.

After a highly successful tour of Japan in 2003, the reunited band was signed with Epic Records, and released the album Astronaut in October 2004. They toured throughout the first half of 2005 before returning to the studio to work on their next new album. Guitarist Andy Taylor left the band again in October 2006, and recordings from this session (with the working title Reportage) were set aside when the band got a chance to work with famed producer Timbaland. The resulting album, Red Carpet Massacre, was released in November 2007. To celebrate its release the band took the unprecedented step of performing the album in its entirety for 10 special performances on Broadway in New York City, with a world tour in 2008.

In December 2010, the band released its 13th studio album, All You Need Is Now, on its own record label, Tapemodern. Initially, an abbreviated version was offered to iTunes, but the physical album arrived in shops in March 2011.

In February 2013, he placed 29th in MusicRadar's greatest bassist poll.

In December 2021, Bass Player magazine awarded Taylor a Lifetime Achievement Award.

== Guest appearances ==
Taylor's side project Neurotic Outsiders has re-convened for an occasional live show or two since a surprise four-show stint at the Viper Room in 1999.

Taylor made his first film appearance outside of Duran Duran as "The Hacker" (alongside then-girlfriend Virginia Hey) in the pilot episode of Timeslip, a 1985 TV programme that was not further developed. He later made a guest appearance in the 1985 Miami Vice episode titled "Whatever Works". In the episode, he, along with Tony Thompson, Andy Taylor, and Michael Des Barres played the Power Station's 1985 hit "Bang a Gong (Get It On)". John was the only band member who had spoken lines, introducing character Sonny Crockett (Don Johnson) to new lead singer Michael Des Barres. Taylor also made cameo appearances in The Flintstones in Viva Rock Vegas, and Politically Incorrect with Bill Maher in 2000, and A Diva's Christmas Carol in 2000 starring Vanessa Williams as the Ghost of Christmas Present, and That '80s Show in 2002. He also appeared on BBC Two comedy panel game Never Mind the Buzzcocks as a panelist in April 2001.

In 2010, he contributed bass to the debut album by Swahili Blonde with ex-Weave! drummer Nicole Turley on the track "Tigress Ritual".

In 2020, he was interviewed in the Michael Cumming/Stewart Lee documentary King Rocker – a film about Robert Lloyd and the Nightingales, in regards to the early punk music scene in Birmingham and his band Shock Treatment.

== Personal life ==
From 1985 to 1989, Taylor dated Danish model Renée Toft Simonsen, to whom he was engaged. He married Amanda De Cadenet at Chelsea Old Town Hall's register office on 24 December 1991, they have one daughter, Atlanta Noo, born on 31 March 1992.

Taylor met his second wife, Gela Nash, co-founder of Juicy Couture, in 1996, and they married in Las Vegas in March 1999.

Taylor and Nash-Taylor reside primarily in Los Angeles, but spend several weeks a year at South Wraxall Manor, which they purchased in 2005. In 2013 Taylor became an American citizen, maintaining dual citizenship.

== Discography ==
=== Studio albums ===
- Feelings Are Good and Other Lies (1997)
- Résumé with Jonathan Elias (1999)
- Meltdown (1999)
- The Japan Album (1999)
- Techno for Two (2001)
- MetaFour (2002)

=== with Duran Duran ===
- Duran Duran (1981)
- Rio (1982)
- Seven and the Ragged Tiger (1983)
- Arena (1984)
- Notorious (1986)
- Big Thing (1988)
- Liberty (1990)
- The Wedding Album (1993)
- Thank You (1995)
- Medazzaland (1997)
- Astronaut (2004)
- Reportage (2006; unreleased)
- Red Carpet Massacre (2007)
- All You Need Is Now (2010)
- Paper Gods (2015)
- Future Past (2021)
- Danse Macabre (2023)

=== with the Power Station ===
- The Power Station (1985)

=== with Neurotic Outsiders ===
- Neurotic Outsiders (1996)

=== Live albums ===
- (:live cuts) (2000)

=== Compilation albums ===
- Only After Dark with Nick Rhodes (2006)

=== Box sets ===
- Retreat into Art (2001)

=== Extended plays ===
- Autodidact (1997)
- The Japan EP (2000)
- Terroristen: Live at the Roxy (2001)

=== Soundtrack appearances ===
- "I Do What I Do" (from 9½ Weeks) (1985)

== Film credits ==
- 1999 – Sugar Town: Clive
- 2000 – Four Dogs Playing Poker: Dick
- 2000 – The Flintstones in Viva Rock Vegas: Keith Richrock
- 2000 – A Diva's Christmas Carol: Ghost of Christmas Present (VH1)
- 2001 – Strange Frequency: Jimmy Blitz (VH1)
- 2001 - Vegas: City of Dreams: Byron Lord

== Television credits ==
Year	Title	Role	Notes
1985	Timeslip: the Block	The Hacker	Yorkshire TV pilot
