= The Power Station (band) =

British-American rock supergroup

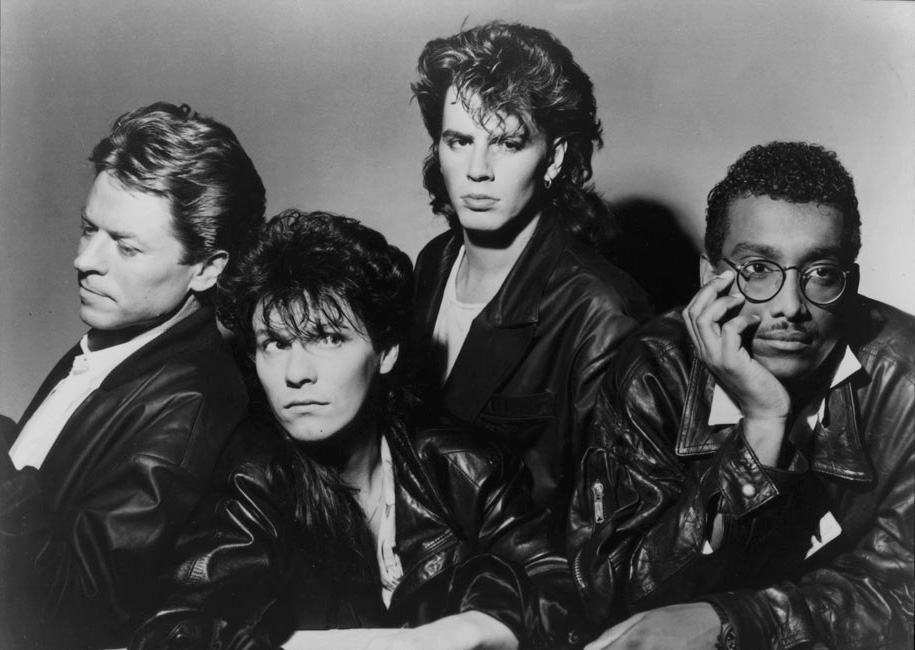
- The Power Station in 1985. L–R: Robert Palmer, Andy Taylor, John Taylor, Tony Thompson

Background information
- Origin: London, England; New York City, U.S.
- Genres: Pop rock; hard rock; dance-rock; funk rock
- Years active: 1984–1985; 1995–1997
- Labels: Capitol; Chrysalis
- Spinoffs: Distance
- Spinoff of: Duran Duran; Chic
- Past members: Andy Taylor; Robert Palmer; John Taylor; Tony Thompson; Bernard Edwards; Michael Des Barres

The Power Station were a British-American 1980s/1990s rock and pop music supergroup originally formed in New York City and London in 1984. It was made up of singer Robert Palmer, former Chic drummer Tony Thompson, and Duran Duran members John Taylor (bass) and Andy Taylor (guitar). Bernard Edwards, also of Chic, was involved on the studio side as recording producer and for a short time also functioned as the Power Station's manager. Edwards also replaced John Taylor on bass for the recording of the band's second album. The band was formed in New York City late in 1984 during a break in Duran Duran's schedule that became a lengthy hiatus. The Power Station was named after the Power Station recording studio in New York, where their first album was conceived and recorded.

== Origins ==
On 23 July 1983, Duran Duran's charity concert at Villa Park in aid of Mencap, a UK charity, took place in Birmingham. Duran Duran had been known to be huge fans of Robert Palmer, so he was invited to participate.

After Duran Duran's third album, Seven and the Ragged Tiger, the members of the band took a planned short hiatus, going into two projects. One of these was the band Arcadia, featuring frontman Simon Le Bon, keyboardist Nick Rhodes, and drummer Roger Taylor, which maintained the melodic and atmospheric aspects of Duran Duran's previous recordings. The other was the Power Station, in which bassist John Taylor and guitarist Andy Taylor worked with Palmer, Thompson, and Edwards to explore more rhythmic and aggressive music rooted in funk and rock and roll. While being mainly the drummer for Arcadia, Roger Taylor also contributed percussion to the Power Station.

The group began as a one-time gathering of friends to provide backing to model and would-be singer Bebe Buell, who wanted to record a cover of the 1971 T. Rex song "Get It On". Both John Taylor and Andy Taylor were eager to branch out from the synthesizer-heavy pop of Duran Duran and play some Led Zeppelin-flavoured rock and roll. The participation of their idols from Chic lent the project a horn-inflected funk vibe that meshed surprisingly well with the crunching guitars and booming drums.

Soon, the project evolved into the idea of a revolving supergroup; a tentative name for the band was Big Brother. The original plan for the one-album project was for the three musicians (the two Taylors and Thompson) to provide musical continuity to an album full of material, with a different singer performing on each track. Those who were approached included Mick Jagger, Billy Idol, Mars Williams, Richard Butler (of the Psychedelic Furs), and Mick Ronson.

The group then invited Palmer to record vocals for the track "Communication". When he heard that they had recorded demos for "Get It On", he asked to try out vocals on that song as well. They decided to record the entire album with him. The group was signed with Capitol Records.

== History ==
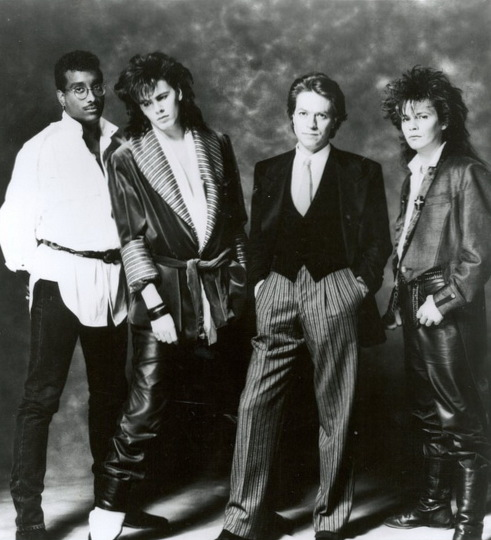
The Power Station in 1985

On 16 February 1985, the band performed "Some Like It Hot" and "Get It On" on Saturday Night Live. It was the only time that Robert Palmer performed live with the original line-up. The horn section for the Power Station's Saturday Night Live appearance included saxophonist Lenny Pickett, who would join the show's house band that fall and eventually become the show's musical director.

In March 1985, the Power Station issued a self-titled album produced by Bernard Edwards, with some informal assistance from Nile Rodgers. It reached number 12 in the United Kingdom and number 6 on the United States album chart.

The record is sometimes referred to as Power Station 33 ⅓ as the sleeve for the original vinyl record release bore that subtitle, indicating the speed of a record turntable. Compact disc issues used CD as a subtitle instead, while initial cassette copies highlighted Capitol's XDR process. The album's cover graphics and color scheme, which were also used in the videos, were based on sketches by John Taylor.

Three singles were released from the album, two of them major hits. The first, "Some Like It Hot", reached number 14 on the UK Singles Chart and number 6 on the US Billboard Hot 100. (The music video featured model Caroline Cossey, credited by her nickname "Tula".) The second single, "Get It On", went to number 22 in the United Kingdom and number 9 in the United States, while competing against the Duran Duran single "A View to a Kill", which was an American number one. "Communication" was not as successful, reaching number 34 in the United States, but disappeared after hitting number 75 in the United Kingdom.

The band also released a collection of their three music videos called The Power Station Video EP.

The group's success led to a summer tour in America with Paul Young, Nik Kershaw, the Bongos, and Orchestral Manoeuvres in the Dark. Palmer then decided to record a solo album to take advantage of his sudden name recognition. This led to Palmer's departure from the band. (Tony Thompson, Andy Taylor, and future Power Station bass player Bernard Edwards all contributed to Palmer's highly successful 1985 solo album Riptide.)

When Palmer exited the tour, some critics referred to it as "unprofessional behaviour". Speaking to Number One magazine in 1986, he hit back at the claims he joined the band for money: "Firstly, I didn't need the money and, secondly the cash was a long time coming. It wasn't exactly an experience that set me up for retirement."

Palmer was also accused of ripping off the Power Station sound for his own records. He replied: "Listen, I gave The Power Station that sound. They took it from me, not the other way around."

With Palmer bowing out, the band recruited singer/actor Michael Des Barres (formerly of Silverhead, Chequered Past, and Detective) for the tour. Des Barres also performed with them at the Live Aid charity concert in Philadelphia that summer.

Des Barres' friendship with actor Don Johnson led to the band's guest appearance on an episode of the television drama Miami Vice. Similarly, his friendship with producer Joel Silver led to the Power Station writing a song called "We Fight for Love" for the Arnold Schwarzenegger action film Commando (1985). The track was originally titled "Someday, Somehow, Someone's Gotta Pay". An EP containing the song plus some live songs from their tour was planned for release that same year, but was scrapped by their record company.

The band folded in late 1985 as its members turned to other projects. John Taylor returned to Duran Duran, while Andy Taylor chose to leave Duran Duran in favour of a solo career. A reformed Led Zeppelin played at the Live Aid concert in 1985, with Thompson sharing drumming duties with Phil Collins. Thompson was to take the place of John Bonham in a reformed Led Zeppelin, but after a few days of rehearsals in 1986, he was seriously injured in a car accident and the reunion never got off the ground. Palmer continued his revitalized solo career, while Des Barres released his second solo album in 1986.

== Reunions and reissues ==
The Power Station reunited in 1996 with its original members: Robert Palmer, Andy Taylor, John Taylor, and Tony Thompson. The group worked together on writing and arranging a new album; however, personal problems forced bassist John Taylor to withdraw from the project and leave the band before any recording took place. Producer Bernard Edwards (Chic bassist) stepped in to become the Power Station's bassist and new fourth member, playing all bass parts on Living in Fear (1996).

Edwards was prepared to tour with the group, but then died suddenly of pneumonia during a trip to Japan. The Power Station decided to press on as a trio augmented by session musicians, and toured first with bassist Guy Pratt and then Manny Yanes and second guitarist Luke Morley, to moderate success. They disbanded shortly after.

In 2002, EMI Music issued The Best of The Power Station as part of their Ten Best Series. All tracks are from the first album (some in remixed form), except for "Taxman" from Living in Fear and the final track, a previously unreleased live version of "Dancing in the Street", recorded at the Hartford Civic Center in 1985 and sung by Michael Des Barres.

Both Robert Palmer and Tony Thompson died in late 2003.

EMI released a new version of the album The Power Station on 21 February 2005, to commemorate the album's 20th anniversary. The package includes the original eight-song album, seven bonus tracks (mostly remixes), and a 40-minute eight-chapter DVD. Among the bonus tracks on the album is the track "Someday, Somehow, Someone's Gotta Pay" (from the Commando OST), sung by Michael Des Barres.

== Band members ==
- Andy Taylor – guitar (1984–1985, 1995–1997)
- Tony Thompson – drums (1984–1985, 1995–1997; died 2003)
- John Taylor – bass (1984–1985, 1995)
- Robert Palmer – lead vocals (1984–1985, 1995–1997; died 2003)
- Michael Des Barres – lead vocals (1985)
- Bernard Edwards – bass (1995–1996; his death)

Touring musicians

- Guy Pratt – bass (1996)
- Manny Yanes – bass (1996–1997)
- Luke Morley – guitars (1996–1997)

== Discography ==
=== Studio albums ===
List of studio albums, with selected details and chart positions
Title	Details	Peak chart positions		
Title	Details	UK	US	AUS
The Power Station	Released: 25 March 1985; Label: Capitol/EMI; Formats: CD, CS, LP	12	6	15
Living in Fear	Released: 30 September 1996; Label: Chrysalis/Capitol, Guardian (US); Formats: CD, CS	—	—	—
"—" denotes a recording that did not chart or was not released in that territory.

=== Compilations ===
- Best of (2003)

=== Singles ===
List of singles, with selected chart positions, showing year released and album name
Title	Year	Peak chart positions											Album
Title	Year	UK	US	US Main.	US Dance	AUT	BEL	CAN	GER	NED	SWI	AUS	Album
"Some Like It Hot"	1985	14	6	34	17	10	6	4	16	9	13	4	The Power Station
"Get It On"	1985	22	9	19	—	—	—	15	37	—	—	8	The Power Station
"Communication"	1985	75	34	—	—	—	—	—	—	—	—	95	The Power Station
"She Can Rock It"	1996	63	—	—	—	—	—	—	—	—	—	—	Living in Fear
"—" denotes a recording that did not chart or was not released in that territory.
