= Andy Taylor (guitarist) =

English pop rock guitarist (born 1961)

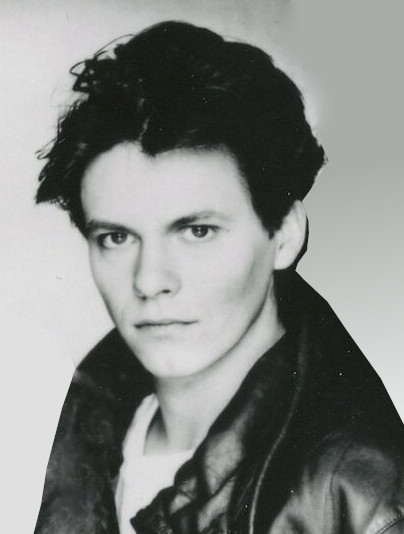
- Taylor in 1983

Background information
- Born: Andrew James Taylor; 16 February 1961 (age 65); Tynemouth, Northumberland, England
- Genres: Rock; new wave; pop; hard rock; dance-rock
- Occupations: Musician; producer; songwriter
- Instruments: Guitar; vocals
- Years active: 1980–2006; 2019–present
- Formerly of: Duran Duran; The Power Station
- Spouse: Tracey Wilson (m. 1982)

Andrew James Taylor (born 16 February 1961) is an English guitarist, best known as a former member of Duran Duran and the Power Station. He has also recorded and performed as a solo artist, and served as a guitarist, songwriter, and record producer for the likes of Robert Palmer, Rod Stewart, the Almighty, Thunder, Love and Money, Mark Shaw, Then Jerico, C. C. Catch, Paul Rodgers (with the Law), Belinda Carlisle, and Gun.

== History ==
=== Background and early musical career ===
Andrew Taylor was born in Tynemouth and raised in the town of Cullercoats, Northumberland, in North East England, and attended Marden High School. He began playing guitar at the age of eleven and was soon playing with local bands, even producing one at the age of 16. He received guitar tuition from Dave Black, a member of the short-lived, post-David Bowie version of Bowie's sometime backing band The Spiders from Mars. He dropped out of school early to tour England and Europe with several different bands, playing working men's clubs and air force bases. Then in April 1980, as Taylor puts it, "I made that fateful train journey down to Birmingham."

=== Duran Duran ===
Duran Duran began their rise to fame at a Birmingham club named the Rum Runner. The club was owned by their managers and mentors, brothers Paul and Michael Berrow. It was centred on the music and ostentatious fashion of the era, particularly disco music, which had fused with punk and electronic to create the sound and look adopted by various New Romantic acts of the time.

Andy Taylor joined the band in April 1980 and has been credited for playing a vital role in shaping and developing their early songs, working creatively with Nick Rhodes playing around the keyboardist's patterns and solidifying the melodies, and assisting in forming the band's "rough, undisciplined mixture[s]" of punk, disco and electronic styles into tight, cohesive structures.

The band signed to EMI Records in December 1980, only seven months after completing their line-up. Their debut single "Planet Earth" was released shortly after that, with their self-titled debut album, Duran Duran, released in June 1981. By 1983, the band was a global success story.

=== The Power Station and Robert Palmer ===
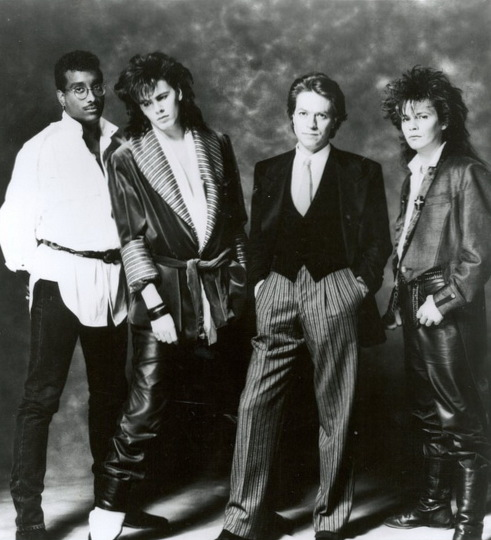
Taylor (far right) with the Power Station in 1985

While Duran Duran were on hiatus in 1985, Andy Taylor and bassist John Taylor joined session drummer and former Chic member Tony Thompson and Robert Palmer to form the Power Station. Their eponymous album, recorded mostly at the New York studio after which the band was named, reached the top 20 in the UK and top 10 in the US, spawning two hit singles with "Some Like It Hot" (UK number 14, US number 6) and a cover of the T. Rex song "Get It On (Bang a Gong)" (UK number 22, US number 9). Palmer performed live with the band only once that year, on Saturday Night Live. After Palmer bowed out at the last moment to go back into the studio to further his newly revitalized solo career, the band toured and even played Live Aid with singer Michael Des Barres as well as making an appearance in a Miami Vice season two episode, "Whatever Works". Taylor also performed with Duran Duran at the Live Aid event.

Palmer recorded the album Riptide in 1985, recruiting Thompson and Andy Taylor to play on some tracks and Power Station producer Bernard Edwards, who worked with Thompson in the group Chic, to lead the production. Palmer recruited Wally Badarou, another Compass Point Star, who had laid synthesizer tracks on the Power Station album plus his long-term drummer, Dony Wynn, for this production as well.

Taylor said: "I don't think any of us could have known at the time that this little venture would lead to the breakup of DD but it did or at least it exposed the cracks in the pavement. I think we were all surprised at the amount of success the project achieved, particularly Robert, whose career was reignited in the USA. It was an extraordinary time, everything we were associated with just flew off the shelves. As well as being the opportunity to express a major musical statement, I guess it was also as much of a statement against the label demands."

=== Solo and production ===
After six years of being a member of Duran Duran, Taylor had realized both the band and he were in freefall. He and the other members rarely spoke to each other, with the band now living on three different continents. Taylor himself was based in Los Angeles, where he met with ex-Sex Pistols guitarist Steve Jones and they began collaborating for Taylor's forthcoming solo album.

In the meantime, he recorded the hit single "Take It Easy" (US number 24), which was used as the theme song for the movie American Anthem. Ex-Missing Persons members Terry Bozzio and Patrick O'Hearn performed drums and bass, respectively, on the song and video. Two other songs by Taylor and Jones also appeared on the album: "Wings of Love" and the instrumental "Angel Eyes". Taylor also contributed to the Miami Vice II soundtrack album with the song "When the Rain Comes Down" (US number 43). It was followed by his first solo album, Thunder (1987). O'Hearn again played bass for him on the album and during the following tour. Also on the Thunder world tour were guitarist Paul Hanson (guitarist) and drummer John Valen. Hanson, Valen and O'Hearn also appeared with Taylor in the music video for the second single from the Thunder album, "Don't Let Me Die Young". Despite moderate success in the US, Taylor's solo material failed to catch on in his native UK.

Throughout 1987 and 1988, Taylor co-wrote and co-produced Rod Stewart's multi-platinum album Out of Order along with Chic members Bernard Edwards and Tony Thompson (the latter of whom had also performed with him in Power Station), spawning the Billboard hits, "Lost in You", "Forever Young", and "My Heart Can't Tell You No".

Taylor also contributed a cover of "Dead on the Money" to the Tequila Sunrise soundtrack in 1988. (Taylor's former band Duran Duran also allowed one of their own songs, "Do You Believe in Shame?", to be included on the album.) A second solo album, consisting of entirely cover versions, titled Dangerous, was released in 1990.

Taylor then moved on to producing full time, working with several successful UK bands during the 1990s. He produced the debut album Back Street Symphony by London rockers Thunder and their follow up Laughing on Judgement Day. It was followed by the Almighty album Soul Destruction and then Mark Shaw's album Almost. Taylor based himself in his now refurbished Trident Studios in London with his then manager and partner Rob Hallett until 1994, when he returned to Los Angeles to write and produce tracks for a second Power Station album and the 1995 Rod Stewart album A Spanner in the Works.

=== Reunions ===
Taylor participated in the 1994 reunion of Power Station. They recorded a second album, Living in Fear, for EMI. During the course of this album, Bernard Edwards died in his hotel room after a Chic gig in Tokyo. The band were shellshocked at his sudden death, but vowed to continue as a trio and complete the project. They subsequently finished the album with Canadian engineer/producer Mike Fraser, with a Japanese and US tours to follow to promote the record.

In 2000, Taylor reunited with the other original members of Duran Duran to record their first new music together since 1985. The band secured a new recording contract with Sony Records. Their ensuing album, 2004 Astronaut, featured a blend of Taylor's heavy guitar with the synth hooks of the classic Duran Duran sound. The first single, "(Reach Up for The) Sunrise", reached number five in the UK, and the album reached number three (number 17 in the US).

Months prior to the album's release, the band played their largest-ever UK tour in the spring of 2004, which was followed by a world tour in 2005, including Asia, Europe, South America, and North America. The band also performed at Live 8.

In 2006, whilst recording a new Duran Duran album, Taylor once again parted ways with the band. The subsequent album, titled Reportage, was temporarily scrapped by the band (with a new 2025 / 2026 release window announced in 2025) after his departure. More recently, Taylor strongly hinted in his blogs that Duran Duran's management company were partly responsible for his departure. This was confirmed when The Sunday Times (UK) printed a retraction on 4 May 2008.

A short controversy followed as Taylor wrote in his 2008 autobiography that there was no "blunt message" and that in addition to the problems of writing and recording Reportage, old conflicts between other band members and himself had resurfaced. The other band members have maintained their version, in which Andy Taylor's chronic inexplicable absences are pointed out. The band issued a statement in the wake of his departure, stating they "will be continuing as Duran Duran without Andy, as we have reached a point in our relationship with him where there is an unworkable gulf between us and we can no longer effectively function together".

In 2019, Andy ended his 13-year hiatus from music and started to tour again, releasing a new single.

After touring with British rock band Reef in 2020, Taylor went on to produce their new album Shoot Me Your Ace, which was released in April 2022.

In March 2023 Taylor rejoined Duran Duran to record a new album, Danse Macabre, which was released that November. Taylor also released Man's a Wolf to Man, his first solo effort in 33 years.

=== RockAffairs ===
In November 2007, Taylor co-founded RockAffairs.com alongside Sarah Eaglesfield, the former Flightside vocalist and webmistress at duranduran.com. RockAffairs was developed to allow unsigned artists to sell MP3s and merchandise, promote their band and keep 100% of the profit. It also pioneered a maverick profit share scheme where all income from listener signups was distributed amongst bands who sign up for the scheme.

In June 2008, Taylor handed control of the website over to Eaglesfield. As of 2017, Taylor remains the owner of RockAffairs Ltd in the UK. Rockaffairs has announced it will be returning for one week of special 10th-anniversary broadcasts during summer 2018.

=== Autobiography ===
In 2008, Taylor published an autobiography, Wild Boy: My Life in Duran Duran, in which he tells his life's story from youth in an extended family to his life with wife Tracey. The book aims to give a backstage look on Duran Duran's rise and a survey of the band's career album by album, as well as of Taylor's solo works and collaborations. It also deals with the iconic status of Duran Duran in the time of early MTV and the band's issues with drugs and alcohol.

== Personal life ==
In 2022, Taylor stated that he has been married to his wife Tracey for 40 years. They have four children. The couple currently reside in Ibiza, Spain.

When Duran Duran was inducted into the Rock and Roll Hall of Fame in 2022, Taylor was unable to attend the ceremony. During the event, Simon Le Bon read part of a letter that Taylor had written revealing he had been diagnosed with stage 4 metastatic prostate cancer in 2018 and a recent setback kept him from attending. The letter was later posted to the band's website, in which Taylor said his condition is incurable but not immediately life-threatening.

== Discography ==
=== Studio albums ===
Title	Year	Peak chart positions	
Title	Year	UK	US
Thunder	1987	61	46
Dangerous	1990	—	—
Man's a Wolf to Man	2023	—	—
Andy Taylor	2024	—	—

=== Unreleased albums ===
- Nobody's Business (1989)

=== Extended plays ===
- The Spanish Sessions (1999, with Luke Morley)

=== with Duran Duran ===
- Duran Duran (1981)
- Rio (1982)
- Seven and the Ragged Tiger (1983)
- Arena (1984)
- Notorious (1986)
- Astronaut (2004)
- Danse Macabre (2023)
- Reportage (unreleased)

=== with the Power Station ===
- The Power Station (1985)
- Living in Fear (1996)

=== with Rod Stewart ===
- Out of Order (1988)
- A Spanner in the Works (1995)

=== with Tina Arena ===
- Love Saves (2023)

=== Singles ===
Title	Year	Peak chart positions				Album
Title	Year	UK	AUS	US	US Main	Album
"Take It Easy"	1986	95	30	24	—	American Anthem soundtrack
"When the Rain Comes Down"	1986	—	—	73	—	Miami Vice II soundtrack
"I Might Lie"	1987	—	—	—	17	Thunder
"Don't Let Me Die Young"	1987	—	—	—	36	Thunder
"Life Goes On"	1987	—	—	—	—	Thunder
"Lola"	1990	60	—	—	—	Dangerous
"Stone Cold Sober"	1990	94	—	—	—	Dangerous
"Love or Liberation" (feat. Gary Stringer)	2019	—	—	—	—	Non-album single
"Man's a Wolf to Man"	2022	—	—	—	—	Man's a Wolf to Man
"—" denotes a recording that did not chart or was not released in that territory.

=== Guest appearances ===
- Lead guitar on "Addicted to Love" (from the Robert Palmer album, Riptide) (1985)
- Lead guitar on "Mad About You" (from the Belinda Carlisle album, Belinda) (1986)

=== Soundtrack appearances ===
- "Take It Easy", "Wings of Love", "Angel Eyes" (from American Anthem) (1986)
- "When the Rain Comes Down" (from Miami Vice) (1986)
- "Dead on the Money" (from Tequila Sunrise) (1988)

== Song meanings ==
- "Love or Liberation" (2019) with Gary Stringer of Reef – written by Taylor and Ricky Warwick on the hundredth day of Donald Trump's presidency, part of the lyrics say, "One hundred days of madness. Who's keeping score?"
- "Influential Blondes" (from the album Man's a Wolf to Man) is "about the rise of fascism in the modern world."

== Bibliography ==
- Taylor, Andy (2008). Wild Boy – My Life in Duran Duran. Grand Central Publishing. ISBN 978-0446509305.

== See also ==
- Bands and musicians from Yorkshire and North East England
