= Thunder discography =

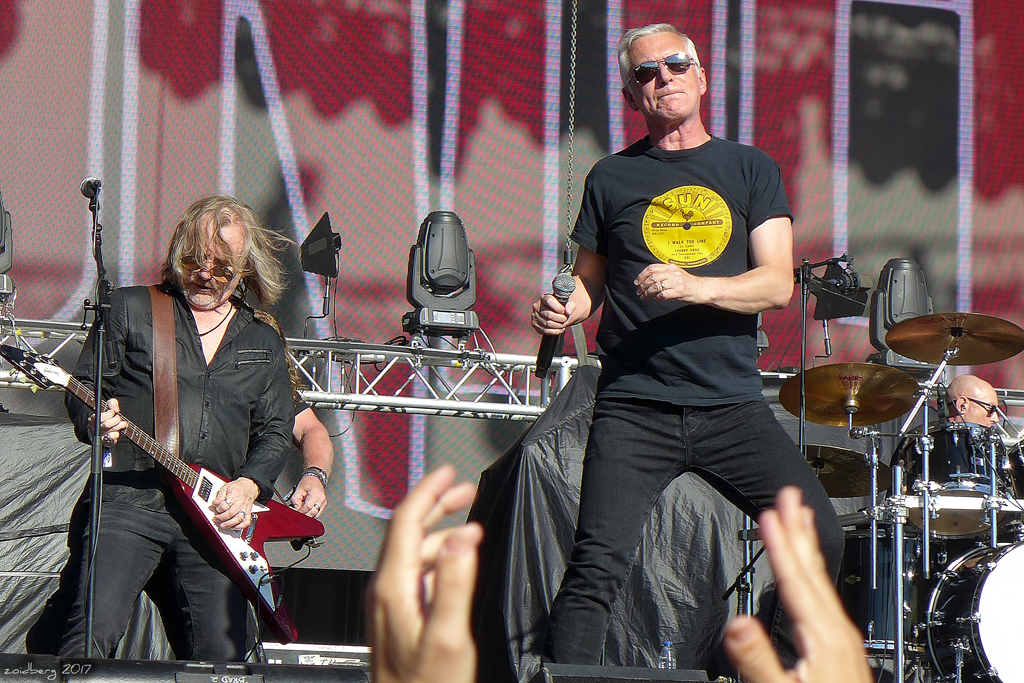
- Thunder in 2017
- Studio albums: 14
- Extended plays: 7
- Live albums: 29
- Compilation albums: 9
- Singles: 26

The discography of Thunder, an English hard rock band, consists of fourteen studio albums, twenty-nine live albums, nine compilation albums, and twenty-two singles.

== Albums ==
=== Studio albums ===
| Year | Album details | Peak chart positions | | | | | | | Certifications |
| Year | Album details | UK | FIN | GER | NLD | SWE | SWI | US | Certifications |
|---|---|---|---|---|---|---|---|---|---|
| 1990 | Backstreet Symphony: Release date: 4 April 1990; Label: EMI, Geffen | 21 | — | — | — | — | — | 114 | BPI: Gold |
| 1992 | Laughing on Judgement Day: Release date: 24 August 1992; Label: EMI, Geffen | 2 | — | 80 | — | 37 | 33 | — | BPI: Gold |
| 1995 | Behind Closed Doors: Release date: 23 January 1995; Label: EMI | 5 | — | 56 | — | 22 | 44 | — | BPI: Silver |
| 1996 | The Thrill of It All: Release date: 2 February 1997; Label: B Lucky | 14 | 40 | — | 89 | — | — | — | |
| 1999 | Giving the Game Away: Release date: 15 March 1999; Label: Eagle | 49 | — | — | — | — | — | — | |
| 2003 | Shooting at the Sun: Release date: 7 April 2003; Label: STC, Frontiers, JVC/Victor | — | — | — | — | — | — | — | |
| 2005 | The Magnificent Seventh: Release date: 25 January 2005; Label: STC | 70 | — | — | — | — | — | — | |
| 2006 | Robert Johnson's Tombstone: Release date: 30 October 2006; Label: STC | 56 | — | — | — | — | — | — | |
| 2008 | Bang!: Release date: 3 November 2008; Label: STC | 62 | — | — | — | — | — | — | |
| 2015 | Wonder Days: Release date: 16 February 2015; Label: earMUSIC | 9 | — | 47 | — | — | 52 | — | |
| 2017 | Rip It Up: Release date: 10 February 2017; Label: earMUSIC | 3 | — | 24 | — | — | 27 | — | |
| 2019 | Please Remain Seated: Release date: 18 January 2019; Label: BMG | 8 | — | 44 | — | — | 50 | — | |
| 2021 | All the Right Noises: Released: 12 March 2021; Label: BMG | 3 | — | 9 | 70 | — | 10 | — | |
| 2022 | Dopamine: Released: 29 April 2022; Label: BMG | 5 | — | 8 | — | — | 8 | — | |
"—" denotes releases that did not chart or were not released in that territory.

=== Live albums ===
| Year | Album | Peak chart positions |
| Year | Album | UK |
|---|---|---|
| 1995 | Live Circuit: Label: Toshiba EMI | — |
| 1998 | Live: Label: Eagle Rock/JVC | 35 |
| 2000 | Open the Window, Close the Door – Live in Japan: Label: JVC | — |
| 2000 | They Think It's All Over... It Is Now: Label: Repertoire/STC Recordings | 108 |
| 2001 | They Think It's All Acoustic... It Is Now: Label: Toshiba EMI/STC Recordings | — |
| 2001 | Live at Donington Monsters of Rock 1990: Label: Toshiba EMI | — |
| 2002 | Symphony and Stage: Label: Snapper | — |
| 2004 | The Best of Thunder Live!: Label: Armoury Records | — |
| 2004 | Live at the Bedford Arms: Label: STC Recordings | — |
| 2005 | Live at Rock City: Label: STC Recordings | — |
| 2005 | Live at Rock City – Case #2: Label: STC Recordings | — |
| 2006 | The Xmas Show – Live 2005: Label: STC Recordings | — |
| 2006 | The Magnificent Five Do Xmas!: Label: STC Recordings | — |
| 2007 | The Xmas Show – Live 2006: Label: STC Recordings | — |
| 2007 | Rock City 6 – The Smell of Snow: Label: STC Recordings | — |
| 2008 | The Xmas Show – Live 2007: Label: STC Recordings | — |
| 2008 | Rock City 8 – The Turkey Strikes Back: Label: STC Recordings | — |
| 2009 | The Xmas Show – Live 2008: Label: STC Recordings | — |
| 2009 | Rock City 10 – A Christmas Cracker: Label: STC Recordings | — |
| 2009 | 20 Years and Out – The Farewell Tour Live: Label: Concert Live | — |
| 2010 | Live at the BBC (1990–1995): Label: EMI | — |
| 2010 | Rough & Ready: Label: STC Recordings | — |
| 2012 | The Xmas Show – Live 2011: Label: STC Recordings | — |
| 2012 | Rock City 12 – The Baubles Are Back in Town: Label: STC Recordings | — |
| 2013 | The Xmas Show – Live 2012: Label: STC Recordings | — |
| 2013 | The Mancunian Candidate: Label: STC Recordings | — |
| 2013 | Live at Donington 1990 & 1992: Label: Parlophone | 73 |
| 2014 | The Xmas Show – Live 2013: Label: STC Recordings | — |
| 2014 | Back to the Black Country: Label: STC Recordings | — |
| 2016 | All You Can Eat: Label: earMUSIC | — |
| 2016 | Live at Loud Park: Label: earMUSIC | — |
| 2018 | Stage (Live): Label: earMUSIC | — |
| 2024 | Live at Islington Academy: Label: earMUSIC | — |
"—" denotes releases that did not chart or were not released in that territory.

=== Extended plays ===
| Title | EP details |
|---|---|
| The Only One | Released: 1998 |
| The Only One (Live) | Released: 1998 |
| Six Shooter | Released: 2005 |
| Six of One | Released: 2007 |
| Half a Dozen of the Other | Released: 2008 |
| The Joy of Six | Released: 2008 |
| Killer | Released: 2015 (as part of 'Wonder Days' Deluxe CD Bundle) |
| Resurrection Day | Released: 2015 (iTunes exclusive) |
| Broken Mirror | Released: 2017 (as part of 'Rip It Up' Deluxe CD/vinyl Bundles) |

=== Compilation albums ===
| Year | Album | Peak chart positions | Certifications |
| Year | Album | UK | Certifications |
|---|---|---|---|
| 1995 | Their Finest Hour (And a Bit) | 22 | BPI: Silver |
| 1998 | Burrn! Presents : The Best of Thunder | — | |
| 1999 | The Rare, the Raw, and the Rest | 109 | |
| 2000 | Gimme Some... | — | |
| 2001 | Rock Champions | — | |
| 2003 | Ballads | — | |
| 2009 | The EP Sessions 2007-2008 | — | |
| 2009 | The Very Best of Thunder | 80 | BPI: Silver |
| 2015 | The Best of Thunder 1989-1995 | — | |
| 2019 | The Greatest Hits | 35 | |
"—" denotes releases that did not chart or were not released in that territory.

== Singles ==
| Year | Title | Chart positions | | | | Album |
| Year | Title | UK | UK Rock | US Hot 100 | US Main. Rock | Album |
|---|---|---|---|---|---|---|
| 1989 | "She's So Fine" | — | — | — | — | Backstreet Symphony |
| 1990 | "Dirty Love" | 32 | — | 55 | 10 | Backstreet Symphony |
| 1990 | "Backstreet Symphony" | 25 | — | — | — | Backstreet Symphony |
| 1990 | "Gimme Some Lovin'" | 36 | — | — | — | Backstreet Symphony |
| 1990 | "She's So Fine" (re-release) | 34 | — | — | — | Backstreet Symphony |
| 1991 | "Love Walked In" | 21 | — | — | 31 | Backstreet Symphony |
| 1992 | "Low Life in High Places" | 22 | — | — | — | Laughing on Judgement Day |
| 1992 | "Everybody Wants Her" | 36 | — | — | — | Laughing on Judgement Day |
| 1993 | "A Better Man" | 18 | — | — | — | Laughing on Judgement Day |
| 1993 | "Like a Satellite" | 25 | — | — | — | Laughing on Judgement Day |
| 1994 | "Stand Up" | 23 | 2 | — | — | Behind Closed Doors |
| 1995 | "River of Pain" | 31 | 5 | — | — | Behind Closed Doors |
| 1995 | "Castles in the Sand" | 30 | 2 | — | — | Behind Closed Doors |
| 1995 | "In a Broken Dream" | 26 | 1 | — | — | The Best of Thunder, Their Finest Hour (And a Bit) |
| 1996 | "Don't Wait Up" | 27 | 2 | — | — | The Thrill of It All |
| 1997 | "Love Worth Dying For" | 60 | 3 | — | — | The Thrill of It All |
| 1998 | "The Only One" | 31 | — | — | — | Thunder Live |
| 1998 | "Play That Funky Music" | 39 | — | — | — | Giving the Game Away |
| 1999 | "You Wanna Know (Just Another Suicide)" | 49 | — | — | — | Giving the Game Away |
| 2002 | "Back for the Crack" | — | — | — | — | |
| 2003 | "Loser" | 48 | 3 | — | — | Shooting at the Sun |
| 2004 | "I Love You More Than Rock n' Roll" | 27 | 1 | — | — | The Magnificent Seventh |
| 2006 | "The Devil Made Me Do It" | 40 | 2 | — | — | Robert Johnson's Tombstone |
| 2014 | "Wonder Days" | — | — | — | — | Wonder Days |
| 2016 | "Rip It Up" | — | — | — | — | Rip It Up |
| 2016 | "No One Gets Out Alive" | — | — | — | — | Rip It Up |
| 2020 | "Last One Out Turn Off the Lights" | — | — | — | — | All the Right Noises |
| 2020 | "You're Gonna Be My Girl" | — | — | — | — | All the Right Noises |
| 2022 | "The Western Sky" | — | — | — | — | Dopamine |
"—" denotes releases that did not chart or were not released in that territory.

== Videos ==
| Title | Album details |
|---|---|
| Backstreet Symphony: The Videos | Released: 1990; Label: PMI; Format: VHS |
| Live | Released: 1998; Label: Eagle Vision; Formats: VHS, DVD |
| In, Out, Put the Kettle On | Released: 2000; Format: VHS |
| Live and Uncut | Released: 2003; Label: STC Recordings; Format: DVD |
| Plug It Out | Released: 2004; Label: STC Recordings; Format: DVD |
| Flawed to Perfection: The Videos | Released: 2005; Label: EMI; Format: DVD |
| Scenes of the Behind | Released: 2006; Label: STC Recordings; Format: DVD |
| Thunder Go Mad in Japan | Released: 2006; Label: STC Recordings; Format: DVD |
| The Devil Went Down to Huttwil | Released: 2007; Label: STC Recordings; Format: DVD |
| At the End of the Road | Released: 2009; Label: STC Recordings; Format: DVD |
| Sight & Sound | Released: 2012; Label: EMI; Format: DVD |
| Live at Donington 1990 | Released: 2013; Label: Parlophone; Format: DVD |
| All You Can Eat | Released: 2016; Label: earMUSIC; Formats: DVD, Blu-ray |
| Stage (Live) | Released: 2018; Label: earMUSIC; Formats: DVD, Blu-ray |
