= Giving the Game Away =

Studio album by Thunder
- Released: 24 February 1999
- Recorded: April 1998
- Studio: At Wessex Sound Studios, Jacobs Studios, Farnham, Surrey, London
- Genre: Hard rock; heavy metal
- Length: 51:00
- Label: Victor
- Producer: Luke Morley

Thunder studio album chronology
The Thrill of It All (1996)	Giving the Game Away (1999)	Shooting at the Sun (2003)

Singles from Giving the Game Away
- 1. "Play That Funky Music" Released: 15 June 1998; 2. "Just Another Suicide (You Wanna Know)" Released: 8 March 1999

Giving the Game Away is the fifth studio album by English hard rock band Thunder. Recorded in April 1998, it was produced the band's lead guitarist Luke Morley. The album was initially released in Japan by Victor Entertainment on 24 February 1999, with the European release by Eagle Records (under the band's B Lucky sub-label) following on 15 March 1999. Giving the Game Away was the last studio album Thunder released before breaking up for the first time the following year.

Following the departure of Mikael "Micke" Höglund in 1996, Giving the Game Away is the first studio album by Thunder to feature bassist Chris Childs. The album was criticised in some reviews for being too "mellow" and marking a departure from the band's previous releases. It was also less successful in commercial terms, spending only one week on the UK Albums Chart at number 49, peaking at number 2 on the UK Rock & Metal Albums Chart and failing to chart in any other region.

Giving the Game Away was promoted only briefly following its release, with just two dates in Japan and ten in the UK between 1 May and 6 June 1999. The band remained inactive for the months following this, and in November announced that they were to break up after one last run of shows. Two singles were released from the album – "Play That Funky Music" and "Just Another Suicide (You Wanna Know)" reached number 39 and number 49, respectively, on the UK Singles Chart.

== Background ==
Thunder recorded their fifth studio album in April 1998. Bassist Chris Childs, who was recording with the band for the first time, described the sessions as "pretty much a party with a recording session breaking out every now and then", in a similar fashion to the way in which guitarist and keyboardist Ben Matthews recalled the sessions for the band's debut album Backstreet Symphony ten years earlier. On 15 June 1998, the band released the first single from the upcoming album, a cover version of Wild Cherry's "Play That Funky Music", which gave charted at number 39 on the UK Singles Chart, and at number 35 on the Scottish Singles Chart.

After a short tour of Japan, a number of festival appearances and some dates supporting Status Quo, the band released "Just Another Suicide" as the second single from the album on 8 March 1999. The single was renamed "You Wanna Know" upon its release in the UK, because the band's label Eagle Records warned the group that the song would receive less radio airplay if it had the word 'suicide' in the title. The track registered on the UK Singles Chart at number 49, and on the Scottish Singles Chart at number 45. Giving the Game Away was released following an "album preview night" at Wulfrun Hall in Wolverhampton two days earlier. The Japanese version of the album featured two additional bonus tracks – "Wonderland" and "The Only One" – while some European editions included a bonus CD which featured the radio edit of "You Wanna Know" and live versions of "With a Little Help from My Friends" (originally by The Beatles) and the band's debut single "She's So Fine".

Giving the Game Away spent only one week on the UK Albums Chart at number 49, the lowest position achieved by the band up to that point. The album also debuted at number 2 on the UK Rock & Metal Albums Chart, behind Neon Ballroom by Silverchair. In promotion of the record, the band played two shows in Japan on 1 and 2 May, followed by a short ten-date tour in the UK between 25 May and 6 June.

== Reception ==
Professional ratings
Review scores
Source	Rating
AllMusic	3/5 stars

Reviewing the album for AllMusic, Eduardo Rivadavia described Giving the Game Away as "an unexpectedly mellow affair, trading in most of the hard rock bombast that characterised the British band's prior releases for slower tempos, unusual restraint, and lots of acoustic guitars". Rivadavia praised the tracks "Time to Get Enough", "Rolling the Dice" and "Just Another Suicide (You Wanna Know)", but complained of a lack of memorable moments elsewhere. He concluded by noting that "amid this wholesale change of musical tact, however, one can still hear Thunder's natural songwriting instincts and versatile musicianship shining through".

== Track listing ==
No.	Title	Writer(s)	Length
1.	"Just Another Suicide (You Wanna Know)"	Luke Morley; Gary "Harry" James	4:10
2.	"All I Ever Wanted"	Morley	4:20
3.	"Giving the Game Away"	Morley	5:05
4.	"You'll Still Need a Friend"	Morley	4:30
5.	"Rolling the Dice"	Morley	4:59
6.	"Numb"	Morley	5:20
7.	"Play That Funky Music" (Wild Cherry cover)	Rob Parissi	3:48
8.	"'Til It Shines"	Morley	4:51
9.	"Time to Get Tough"	Morley	3:53
10.	"It's Another Day"	Morley	4:42
11.	"It Could Be Tonight"	Morley; James; Andy Taylor	5:22
Total length:			51:00

Japanese edition bonus tracks
No.	Title	Writer(s)	Length
12.	"Wonderland"	Morley	4:16
13.	"The Only One"	Morley; James	3:58
Total length:			59:14

European special edition bonus disc
No.	Title	Writer(s)	Length
1.	"You Wanna Know" (radio edit)	Morley; James
2.	"With a Little Help from My Friends" (live The Beatles cover)	John Lennon; Paul McCartney
3.	"She's So Fine" (live)	Morley; Taylor

== Personnel ==
- Danny Bowes – vocals
- Luke Morley – guitar, production
- Ben Matthews – guitar, keyboards
- Chris Childs – bass
- Gary "Harry" James – drums, percussion
- Andy Taylor – acoustic guitar (track 11)
- Lynne Malkin – backing vocals - (track 10)

== Charts ==
Chart (1999)	Peak position
UK Albums (OCC)	49
UK Rock & Metal Albums (OCC)	2

Chart (2023)	Peak position
Scottish Albums (OCC)	25
UK Independent Albums (OCC)	18

== Bibliography ==
- McIver, Joel (October 2016), Giving the Game Away: The Thunder Story, London, England: Omnibus Press (published 11 November 2016), ISBN 978-1785581373
