= Live (Thunder album) =

Live album by Thunder
- Released: 16 February 1998
- Recorded: 12 – 16 November 1997
- Venue: Wulfrun Hall (Wolverhampton, England) and Shepherd's Bush Empire (London, England)
- Genre: Hard rock; heavy metal
- Length: 125:09 (album); 84:10 (video)
- Label: Eagle Rock (album); Eagle Vision (video)
- Producer: Luke Morley

Thunder live album chronology
Live Circuit (1995)	Live (1998)	They Think It's All Over... It Is Now (2000)

Thunder video chronology
Backstreet Symphony: The Videos (1990)	Live (1998)	In, Out, Put the Kettle On (2000)

Live is the second live album by the English hard rock band Thunder and the first released outside of Japan. Recorded over four shows in November 1997 at Wulfrun Hall in Wolverhampton and Shepherd's Bush Empire in London, it was produced by the band's lead guitarist Luke Morley and engineered and mixed by Mike Fraser. It was released by Eagle Rock Entertainment on 16 February 1998. An accompanying video was released by Eagle Vision on 28 March 1998.

Following the departure of Mikael "Micke" Höglund in 1996, Live is the first release by Thunder with the bass guitarist Chris Childs. It is also the band's first release on the Eagle label, with whom they signed in November 1997. The album includes songs from all four of the band's studio albums released up to that point, as well as a number of cover versions. Live reached number 35 on the UK Albums Chart, while the video album reached number 10 on the UK Music Video Chart.

Live was promoted on its own concert tour which began with shows across Europe on 3 March 1998, with a leg of UK performances in May and June, followed by a run of Japanese dates in June and early July. The band also supported Status Quo on a European tour in April. "The Only One" was released as a single with a studio recording of the song on 26 January 1998, reaching number 31 on the UK Singles Chart and number 38 on the Scottish Singles Chart.

== Background and recording ==
After three "warm-up shows" in Belgium and the Netherlands, Thunder recorded Live on 12 and 13 November 1997 at Wulfrun Hall in Wolverhampton, and 15 and 16 November 1997 at Shepherd's Bush Empire in London. On 26 January 1998, the band released the single "The Only One", which included a disc featuring four tracks from the album's live recordings. The single reached number 31 on the UK Singles Chart and number 38 on the Scottish Singles Chart. The album was released in the UK on 16 February 1998, debuting at number 35 on the UK Albums Chart, number 75 on the Scottish Albums Chart, and number 1 on the UK Rock & Metal Albums Chart. The album was released in Japan five days later, featuring bonus tracks "Pilot of My Dreams", "Everybody Wants Her" and "Stand Up".

== Promotion and release ==
The Live video album was released in Japan on 28 March and in the UK on 30 March. The video has 16 of the 25 tracks featured on the live album, while special editions were released with a bonus CD featuring 12 recordings. The Live video album debuted at number 33 on the UK Music Video Chart, peaking at number 10 the following week. Several tracks were later featured on the live compilation album The Best of Thunder Live!, released in 2004. Live was promoted on a concert tour beginning with a European stint starting in Paris on 3 March, followed by a leg of UK shows between 11 May and 11 June, two European festival appearances, and a short Japanese run of dates between 30 June and 4 July. The band also played as a support act for Status Quo in Europe between 17 April and 7 May.

== Track listings ==
=== Live album ===
Disc one
No.	Title	Writer(s)	Length
1.	"Welcome to the Party"	Luke Morley; Gary "Harry" James	4:58
2.	"Higher Ground"	Morley	7:11
3.	"Don't Wait Up"	Morley	4:00
4.	"Low Life in High Places"	Morley	5:23
5.	"Gimme Some Lovin'"	Spencer Davis; Steve Winwood; Muff Winwood	6:46
6.	"Empty City"	Morley; Andy Taylor	7:57
7.	"Until My Dying Day"	Morley; Taylor	8:27
8.	"A Better Man"	Morley	4:01
9.	"Does It Feel Like Love?"	Morley	5:21
10.	"Dance to the Music" (Sly and the Family Stone cover)	Sly Stone	5:25
11.	"She's So Fine"	Morley; Taylor	5:11
Total length:			64:50

Disc two
No.	Title	Writer(s)	Length
1.	"Backstreet Symphony"	Morley	4:46
2.	"An Englishman on Holiday"	Morley	6:13
3.	"I'll Be Waiting"	Morley	4:35
4.	"Laughing on Judgement Day"	Morley	4:56
5.	"Like a Satellite"	Morley	5:13
6.	"Moth to the Flame"	Morley; Taylor; Mikael Höglund	6:38
7.	"Living for Today"	Morley	4:17
8.	"The Only One"	Morley; James	4:11
9.	"Love Walked In"	Morley	6:58
10.	"River of Pain"	Morley	3:59
11.	"Dirty Love"	Morley	6:43
Total length:			58:29

Japanese edition disc one bonus tracks
No.	Title	Writer(s)	Length
12.	"Pilot of My Dreams"	Morley
13.	"Everybody Wants Her"	Morley; James; Danny Bowes; Ben Matthews

Japanese edition disc two bonus tracks
No.	Title	Writer(s)	Length
3.	"Stand Up"	Morley	4:00
Total length:			62:29

=== Video album ===
No.	Title	Writer(s)	Length
1.	"New York, New York" (Liza Minnelli cover)	John Kander; Fred Ebb	4:00
2.	"Welcome to the Party"	Morley; James	4:58
3.	"Higher Ground"	Morley	7:11
4.	"I'll Be Waiting"	Morley	4:35
5.	"Until My Dying Day"	Morley; Taylor	8:27
6.	"Gimme Some Lovin'"	Davis; S. Winwood; M. Winwood	6:46
7.	"A Better Man"	Morley	4:01
8.	"Living for Today"	Morley	4:17
9.	"Lazy Sunday Afternoon" (Small Faces cover)	Steve Marriott; Ronnie Lane	3:30
10.	"Stand Up"	Morley; James	4:00
11.	"Love Walked In"	Morley	6:58
12.	"River of Pain"	Morley	3:59
13.	"She's So Fine"	Morley; Taylor	5:11
14.	"Low Life in High Places"	Morley	5:23
15.	"The Only One"	Morley; James	4:11
16.	"Dirty Love"	Morley	6:43
Total length:			84:10

Special edition bonus CD
No.	Title	Writer(s)	Length
1.	"Welcome to the Party"	Morley; James	4:58
2.	"Gimme Some Lovin'"	Davis; S. Winwood; M. Winwood	6:46
3.	"She's So Fine"	Morley; Taylor	5:11
4.	"Low Life in High Places"	Morley	5:23
5.	"A Better Man"	Morley	4:01
6.	"Like a Satellite"	Morley	5:13
7.	"Laughing on Judgement Day"	Morley	4:56
8.	"River of Pain"	Morley	3:59
9.	"Don't Wait Up"	Morley	4:00
10.	"Backstreet Symphony"	Morley	4:46
11.	"The Only One"	Morley; James	4:11
12.	"Dirty Love"	Morley	6:43
Total length:			60:07

== Personnel ==
- Danny Bowes – vocals
- Luke Morley – guitar, backing vocals, harmonica, production
- Ben Matthews – guitar, keyboards, backing vocals
- Chris Childs – bass, backing vocals
- Gary "Harry" James – drums, percussion, backing vocals, guitar
- Mike Fraser – recording, engineering, mixing
