= Wonder Days =

Studio album by Thunder
- Released: 11 February 2015
- Studio: Rockfield Studios (Monmouth, Wales)
- Genre: Hard rock; heavy metal
- Length: 48:03
- Label: earMusic
- Producer: Luke Morley

Thunder studio album chronology
Bang! (2008)	Wonder Days (2015)	Rip It Up (2017)

Singles from Wonder Days
- 1. "Wonder Days" Released: 16 February 2015; 2. "When the Music Played" Released: 18 April 2015; 3. "Resurrection Day" Released: 19 April 2015

Alternate covers
- iTunes deluxe edition cover

Alternative cover
- Physical deluxe edition cover

Wonder Days is the tenth studio album by English hard rock band Thunder. Recorded in late 2014 at Rockfield Studios in Monmouth, Wales, it was produced by the band's lead guitarist Luke Morley and released internationally by earMusic in February 2015. Wonder Days was the first Thunder studio album to be released since Bang! in 2008, as well as the band's first release on earMusic with whom they signed after returning from their second breakup in 2014.

After breaking up for a second time in 2009, Thunder returned occasionally for a number of shows between 2011 and 2014, before recording a tenth studio album later in the year. Morley wrote all of the material for the album, with the exception of "Black Water" which was co-written by Saint Jude vocalist Lynne Jackaman. Much of the album does not feature guitarist and keyboardist Ben Matthews, who spent most of 2014 recovering from head and neck cancer.

Wonder Days debuted at number 9 on the UK Albums Chart, marking the band's first top ten album since Behind Closed Doors reached number 5 in 1995. The album also charted in Germany and Sweden for the first time in 20 years, and topped the UK Rock & Metal Albums Chart. "Wonder Days", "When the Music Played" and "Resurrection Day" were released as singles, while the extended play (EP) Killer was made available as part of various album bundles.

== Recording and production ==
Despite claiming on multiple occasions since returning from their 2009 breakup that they would not record a tenth studio album, Thunder announced in May 2014 that they would return to the studio to work on new material later in the year. Responding to the question over the band's "change of heart" regarding the possibility of new material, the band's vocalist Danny Bowes commented that they decided to record a new album after receiving an "overwhelming response" from fans when they supported Journey and Whitesnake the previous year. In the band's 2016 biography Giving the Game Away: The Thunder Story, the band's lead guitarist Luke Morley added that "We hadn't anticipated that reaction at all, so I said to Danny, "We should make a record, because we may not get this kind of opportunity again"."

Recording for Wonder Days took place at Rockfield Studios in Monmouth, Wales, with Morley once again producing the album. Much of the recording took place without the involvement of second guitarist and keyboardist Ben Matthews, who was diagnosed with head and neck cancer at the beginning of the year and was unable to take part in sessions and shows throughout the year. Speaking about Matthews's absence, bassist Chris Childs reflected that "It was different in the studio without Ben – not just musically but also with his personality. He brings a lot to everything we do." Standing in for Matthews at the group's 2014 shows was Peter Shoulder, a bandmate of Morley's in The Union. By November 2014, it was announced that Matthews's treatment had worked and he was given the "all-clear".

== Promotion and release ==
Thunder released a music video for "Wonder Days", which was filmed during the song's debut performance at Loud Park Festival in Tokyo, Japan on 19 October, as the first song from Wonder Days on 25 November 2014. Days later the album was announced for release on earMusic on 16 February 2015. Several editions of Wonder Days were released, including a physical deluxe edition including a bonus disc recorded live at Wacken Open Air in 2013 and a "super deluxe bundle" which also included a 7" vinyl single for the album's title track and an extended play called Killer featuring four new tracks. "When the Music Played" was released on 10" vinyl as a Record Store Day exclusive single on 18 April 2015, before "Resurrection Day" was released as the third and final single from the album the following day.

In promotion of Wonder Days, Thunder announced their first three UK arena headline shows for March 2015, with support bands Reef and Tax the Heat. Bowes explained that while the band "would have preferred to do more" shows, they did not want to "put undue pressure" on Matthews, who was still recovering from cancer at the time. The band later played a number of shows in Europe between June and August, including at Download Festival and a ZZ Top support slot at Wembley Arena, toured Europe again in November, played a pair of dates in Japan at the end of the year, and returned to the UK in February 2016.

== Reception ==
=== Commercial ===
Wonder Days debuted at number 9 on the UK Albums Chart, marking the first time Thunder had reached the UK top ten since 1995's Behind Closed Doors peaked at number 5. It also topped the UK Rock & Metal Albums Chart, and reached number 5 on the UK Physical Albums Chart, number 9 on the Scottish Albums Chart, number 31 on the UK Album Downloads Chart, and number 40 on the UK Album Sales Chart. Outside of the UK, the album also registered on album charts in Germany (at number 47), Switzerland (at number 52), Japan (at number 54), and the Wallonia region of Belgium (at number 180).

=== Critical ===
Professional ratings
Review scores
Source	Rating
Classic Rock	4/5 stars
The Yorkshire Times	4/5

Reviewing the album for Classic Rock magazine, Malcolm Dome awarded Wonder Days a rating of four out of five stars, describing it as "Classy, fresh and memorable". Praising the "rigorous, blues-tinged melodic hard rock elements which established the band's reputation in the first place", Dome highlighted the performances of guitarist Luke Morley and vocalist Danny Bowes, and hailed the album as "a massive reminder that class is both timeless and incandescent". The Yorkshire Times writer Graham Clark dubbed Wonder Days a "fine return to form", highlighting songs including "Wonder Days", "When the Music Played", "The Thing I Want" and "Serpentine".

Chris Chantler of TeamRock selected "The Thing I Want" as one of six "tracks of the week" on 6 March 2015, Classic Rock highlighted "Resurrection Day" in a similar feature later in the month, and at the end of the year Wonder Days was selected by the magazine as the 11th best album of the year.

== Track listing ==
All tracks are written by Luke Morley, except where noted.

No.	Title	Length
1.	"Wonder Days"	4:49
2.	"The Thing I Want"	3:43
3.	"The Rain"	4:45
4.	"Black Water" (co-written by Lynne Jackaman)	3:41
5.	"The Prophet"	4:37
6.	"Resurrection Day"	4:29
7.	"Chasing Shadows"	3:52
8.	"Broken"	4:11
9.	"When the Music Played"	6:09
10.	"Serpentine"	4:20
11.	"I Love the Weekend"	3:27
Total length:		48:03

Japanese edition bonus track
No.	Title	Length
12.	"Stand Up" (live at Brooklyn Bowl) (co-written by Gary "Harry" James)	4:08
Total length:		52:11

Digital deluxe edition bonus tracks
No.	Title	Length
12.	"Black Water" (acoustic) (co-written by Lynne Jackaman)	3:06
13.	"Broken" (acoustic)	4:09
Total length:		55:18

Physical deluxe edition disc two: Live at Wacken 2013
No.	Title	Length
1.	"Dirty Love"	8:43
2.	"River of Pain"	3:50
3.	"Higher Ground"	7:31
4.	"Low Life in High Places"	5:45
5.	"Backstreet Symphony"	5:06
6.	"The Devil Made Me Do It"	5:03
7.	"You Can't Keep a Good Man Down"	8:30
8.	"Love Walked In"	7:35
9.	"I Love You More Than Rock 'n' Roll"	5:52
Total length:		57:55

== Personnel ==
- Danny Bowes – vocals
- Luke Morley – guitar, keyboards, harmonica, percussion, backing vocals, production
- Chris Childs – bass
- Gary "Harry" James – drums, percussion
- Nigel Hopkins – piano
- Emily Lynn – backing vocals
- Helena-May Harrison – backing vocals
- Katy Burgess – backing vocals
- Lara Smiles – backing vocals
- Susie Webb – backing vocals
- Nick Brine – engineering
- Jon Constantine – engineering assistance
- Josh Tyrrell – engineering assistance
- Mike Fraser – mixing
- Joel Davies – mixing assistance
- Pete Maher – mastering
- Hugh Gilmour – design
- Jason Joyce – photography

== Chart positions ==
Chart (2015)	Peak position
Belgian Albums (Ultratop Wallonia)	180
German Albums (Offizielle Top 100)	47
Japanese Albums (Oricon)	54
Scottish Albums (OCC)	9
Swiss Albums (Schweizer Hitparade)	52
UK Albums (OCC)	9
UK Album Downloads (OCC)	31
UK Album Sales (OCC)	40
UK Physical Albums (OCC)	5
UK Rock & Metal Albums (OCC)	1

== Bibliography ==
- McIver, Joel (11 November 2016), Giving the Game Away: The Thunder Story, London, England: Omnibus Press, ISBN 978-1785581373
