= Bang! (Thunder album) =

Studio album by Thunder
- Released: 3 November 2008
- Studio: Walton Castle (Clevedon, Somerset, England)
- Genre: Hard rock; heavy metal
- Length: 54:09
- Label: STC
- Producer: Luke Morley

Thunder studio album chronology
Robert Johnson's Tombstone (2006)	Bang! (2008)	Wonder Days (2015)

Bang! is the ninth studio album by English hard rock band Thunder. Recorded at Walton Castle in Clevedon, North Somerset, it was produced by the band's lead guitarist Luke Morley. The album was released in the UK by STC Recordings on 3 November 2008, and later in Europe by Frontiers Records and in Japan by Victor Entertainment. The album was released alongside the extended play The Joy of Six, containing six previously unreleased tracks.

Bang! debuted at number 62 on the UK Albums Chart and number 2 on the UK Rock & Metal Albums Chart. No singles were released from the album, although "On the Radio" was issued as a promotional release. Following the album's release, Thunder completed a short concert tour in the UK before announcing that they were due to disband for a second time in August 2009, with the final run of shows dubbed "20 Years & Out: The Farewell Tour".

== Background ==
Prior to working on their ninth album, Thunder recorded and released two extended plays (EPs) of new tracks and live recordings – Six of One... and ...Half a Dozen of the Other – which were released on 8 October 2007 and 7 April 2008, respectively. A third EP, The Joy of Six, was issued on the same day as Bang! and came in a box designed to house both previous EPs. Sessions for Bang! began in February 2008, with the band working at Walton Castle in Clevedon, North Somerset. Ben Matthews recalls that "Recording at the castle was a real experience. Taking our Pro Tools rig and a big box of microphones, we turned one castle turret into a control room and another turret into a recording studio. Linking them with a long cable, I had to climb up and run it along the top of the castle walls." Matthews likened the production process to that of Deep Purple's 1972 album Machine Head, which was recorded at the Grand Hotel in Montreux, Switzerland using the Rolling Stones Mobile Studio.

Bang! was released in the UK by STC Recordings on 3 November 2008, following a launch party on 27 October at the Hard Rock Cafe in Manchester featuring an acoustic set from the band. The album was later released in Europe by Frontiers Records and in Japan by Victor Entertainment, the latter of which featured two bonus tracks. It debuted at number 62 on the UK Albums Chart, number 2 on the UK Rock & Metal Albums Chart, and number 73 on the Scottish Albums Chart. Outside of the UK, it reached number 99 on the Oricon Albums Chart in Japan. The album's opening track "On the Radio" was released as the only promotional single from the album. Bang! was promoted on a short eight-date tour of the UK from 21 to 30 November 2008, before the band announced in January 2009 that they were due to break up after a farewell tour running until August.

== Track listing ==
All tracks are written by Luke Morley, except where noted

No.	Title	Length
1.	"On the Radio"	4:15
2.	"Stormwater"	4:56
3.	"Carol Ann"	4:38
4.	"Retribution"	4:26
5.	"Candy Man"	4:00
6.	"Have Mercy"	4:56
7.	"Watching Over You" (co-written by Andy Taylor and Mike Keen)	4:35
8.	"Miracle Man"	4:22
9.	"Turn Left at California"	5:17
10.	"Love Sucks"	4:38
11.	"One Bullet"	3:43
12.	"Honey"	4:23
Total length:		54:09

Japanese edition bonus tracks
No.	Title	Length
13.	"Chain Reaction"	4:50
14.	"I Believe"	5:21
Total length:		64:20

== Personnel ==
- Danny Bowes – vocals
- Luke Morley – guitar, backing vocals, production
- Ben Matthews – guitar, keyboards, engineering, mixing
- Chris Childs – bass
- Gary "Harry" James – drums, percussion

== Charts ==
Chart (2008)	Peak position
Japanese Albums (Oricon)	99
Scottish Albums (OCC)	25
UK Albums (OCC)	62
UK Rock & Metal Albums (OCC)	2

Chart (2024)	Peak position
UK Independent Albums (OCC)	14

== Bibliography ==
- McIver, Joel (October 2016), Giving the Game Away: The Thunder Story, London, England: Omnibus Press (published 11 November 2016), ISBN 978-1785581373
