= The Thrill of It All (Thunder album) =

Studio album by Thunder
- Released: 1 September 1996
- Recorded: April – May 1996
- Studio: Rockfield Studios (Monmouth, Wales)
- Genre: Hard rock; heavy metal
- Length: 51:38
- Label: Victor
- Producer: Luke Morley

Thunder studio album chronology
Behind Closed Doors (1995)	The Thrill of It All (1996)	Giving the Game Away (1999)

Singles from The Thrill of It All
- 1. "Don't Wait Up" Released: 16 September 1996; 2. "Love Worth Dying For" Released: 21 January 1997

The Thrill of It All is the fourth studio album by English hard rock band Thunder. Recorded between April and May 1996 at Rockfield Studios in Monmouth, Wales, it was produced the band's lead guitarist Luke Morley and mixed by Rupert Coulson at London's Trident 2. The album was initially released in Japan by Victor Entertainment on 1 September 1996, with the European release by Castle Communications (under the band's B Lucky sub-label) following on 2 February 1997.

Unlike they did on Laughing on Judgement Day and Behind Closed Doors, Thunder vocalist Danny Bowes and second guitarist Ben Matthews did not contribute to songwriting on The Thrill of It All – all songs were written primarily by main songwriter Morley, with drummer Gary "Harry" James co-writing four tracks. For personal reasons which eventually led to his departure in the summer of 1996, bassist Mikael "Micke" Höglund did not perform on the album, with all bass recorded by Morley.

The Thrill of It All reached number 14 on the UK Albums Chart and number 5 on the UK Rock & Metal Albums Chart. The band promoted the album on tour throughout early 1997, with shows in Japan, the UK and Europe between January and May. Two singles were released from The Thrill of It All – "Don't Wait Up" and "Love Worth Dying For" peaked at number 27 and number 60 on the UK Singles Chart, and number 2 and number 3 on the UK Rock & Metal Singles Chart, respectively.

== Recording and production ==
Throughout January and February 1996, Thunder lead guitarist Luke Morley, guitarist and keyboardist Ben Matthews and drummer Gary "Harry" James, along with former producer Andy Taylor, began working on new material for the band's fourth studio album in Spain. During this time, vocalist Danny Bowes was setting up the band's own record label B Lucky, which would be distributed through Castle Communications. The band's bassist Mikael "Micke" Höglund chose not to be involved in the album's sessions due to his girlfriend being pregnant at the time, which would later lead to his leaving the band. Instead of hiring a replacement for Höglund immediately, Morley decided to play bass on the album and the band would hire a new bassist later. Chris Childs was hired in time for the UK release of The Thrill of It All. Recording was completed between April and May 1996 at Rockfield Studios in Monmouth, Wales, and the album was mixed at London's Trident 2 by Rupert Coulson.

== Promotion and release ==
"Don't Wait Up" was released as the first single from The Thrill of It All in Japan on 16 September 1996, and later in the UK and Europe on 12 January 1997, alongside a "funky 50s style video". The single debuted at number 27 on the UK Singles Chart and number 2 on the UK Rock & Metal Singles Chart, behind Reef's "Come Back Brighter". "Love Worth Dying For" was released as the album's second single in Japan on 21 January 1997, and later in the UK and Europe on 24 March 1997. It reached number 60 on the UK Singles Chart and number 3 on the UK Rock & Metal Singles Chart, behind tracks by Silverchair and Dinosaur Jr. A music video was filmed for "Love Worth Dying For" in January 1997, but was not released. Speaking about the video, drummer Gary "Harry" James explained that the video "never saw the light of day, and it never will. They wanted me to jump up and down in Doc Martens boots and a fairy outfit. We went with it for some reason, rather than telling them to fuck off."

The Thrill of It All was originally released in Japan by Victor Entertainment on 1 September 1996. However, the scheduled European release of the album was delayed after Ben Matthews was diagnosed with acute tendinitis and was unable to play guitar, preventing the band from touring. The album was eventually issued on 2 February 1997 by Castle Communications, under the band's own B Lucky sub-label. Following the record's initial release, Thunder completed a short tour of Japan from 24 January to 1 February, before embarking on the UK leg of The Thrill of It All Tour on the day of the album's European release. However, during the Japanese tour vocalist Danny Bowes fell ill with pneumonia and laryngitis, which resulted in a number of shows on the UK tour having to be rescheduled to April.

== Commercial reception ==
Upon its release, The Thrill of It All debuted at number 14 on the UK Albums Chart, its peak position, and at number 5 on the UK Rock & Metal Albums Chart. The album also reached the top 40 of the Scottish Albums Chart, peaking at number 29. Outside of the UK, The Thrill of It All reached number 40 on the Finnish Albums Chart, and number 89 on the Dutch Albums Chart.

== Critical reception ==
Professional ratings
Review scores
Source	Rating
AllMusic	2/5 stars

Reviewing the album for AllMusic, Eduardo Rivadavia criticised the lack of memorable songs on The Thrill of It All, stating that "ensconced among the mindless drivel ... and the insipidly frivolous ... governing these sessions, one will find occasionally memorable efforts". Rivadavia concluded by summarising that "The Thrill of It All sounds unbearably safe by today's standards, a relic of a far more commercial era in rock history and, therefore, really not very thrilling at all".

== Track listing ==
No.	Title	Writer(s)	Length
1.	"Pilot of My Dreams"	Luke Morley	4:31
2.	"Living for Today"	Morley	4:04
3.	"Love Worth Dying For"	Morley	4:03
4.	"Don't Wait Up"	Morley	4:03
5.	"Something About You"	Morley; Gary "Harry" James	5:03
6.	"Welcome to the Party"	Morley; James	4:42
7.	"The Thrill of It All"	Morley; James	5:35
8.	"Hotter Than the Sun"	Morley	4:48
9.	"This Forgotten Town"	Morley; James	5:06
10.	"Cosmetic Punk"	Morley	3:43
11.	"You Can't Live Your Life in a Day"	Morley	6:00
Total length:			51:38

Japanese edition bonus track
No.	Title	Writer(s)	Length
12.	"Too Bad"	Morley; Andy Taylor	4:16
Total length:			55:54

French edition bonus disc
No.	Title	Writer(s)	Length
1.	"Love Worth Dying For" (acoustic version)	Morley	3:21
2.	"Something About You" (acoustic version)	Morley; James	3:53
3.	"You Can't Live Your Life in a Day" (acoustic version)	Morley	4:07
Total length:			11:23

2004 remastered edition bonus disc
No.	Title	Writer(s)	Length
1.	"Don't Wait Up" (extended version)	Morley	4:35
2.	"Hirsute Boogie"	Morley; James; Danny Bowes; Ben Matthews	2:15
3.	"Every Word's a Lie"	Morley	4:13
4.	"Somebody to Love"	Morley	4:07
5.	"Lethal Combination"	Morley; James	3:41
6.	"Love Worth Dying For" (acoustic version)	Morley	3:21
7.	"Something About You" (acoustic version)	Morley; James	3:53
8.	"Bring It on Home" (acoustic version) (Sam Cooke cover)	Sam Cooke	3:16
9.	"You Can't Live Your Life in a Day" (acoustic version)	Morley	4:07
10.	"Too Bad"	Morley; Taylor	4:16
11.	"Love Worth Dying For" (enhanced video)	Morley	3:43
Total length:			41:27

== Personnel ==
Thunder

- Danny Bowes – vocals
- Luke Morley – guitar, bass, production
- Ben Matthews – guitar, keyboards
- Gary "Harry" James – drums, percussion

Additional performers

- Ellie Lawson – backing vocals (tracks 4 and 7)
- Andy Taylor – additional guitar ("Too Bad")

Additional personnel

- Rupert Coulson – engineering, mixing
- Paul Read – engineering assistance
- Nick Brine – engineering assistance
- Harry Sarrikostas – engineering assistance
- Mark Embleton – mastering
- Hugh Gilmore – artwork, design
- Kasuyuo Sandford – photography

== Charts ==
Chart (1997)	Peak position
Dutch Albums (Album Top 100)	89
Finnish Albums (Suomen virallinen lista)	40
Scottish Albums (OCC)	29
UK Albums (OCC)	14
UK Rock & Metal Albums (OCC)	5

Chart (2023)	Peak position
UK Independent Albums (OCC)	20

== Bibliography ==
- McIver, Joel (October 2016), Giving the Game Away: The Thunder Story, London, England: Omnibus Press (published 11 November 2016), ISBN 978-1785581373
