= Rip It Up (Thunder album) =

Studio album by Thunder
- Released: 10 February 2017
- Recorded: Rockfield Studios, Monmouth, 2016
- Genre: Hard rock
- Length: 51:13
- Label: earMUSIC
- Producer: Luke Morley

Thunder chronology
Wonder Days (2015)	Rip It Up (2017)	Please Remain Seated (2019)

Professional ratings
Review scores
Source	Rating
Planet Mosh	4/5 stars
Maximum Volume Music	9/10 stars

Rip It Up is the eleventh studio album by hard rock band Thunder and the follow-up to their 2015 album Wonder Days. The album was released in the UK on 10 February 2017 and entered the UK album chart at number three, giving the band their highest placing since their 1992 album Laughing on Judgement Day.

== Track listing ==
All songs written by Luke Morley.

1. "No One Gets Out Alive" – 4:21
2. "Rip It Up – 4:43
3. "She Likes the Cocaine" – 4:34
4. "Right from the Start" – 5:23
5. "Shakedown" – 4:08
6. "Heartbreak Hurricane" – 4:46
7. "In Another Life" – 4:57
8. "The Chosen One" – 5:09
9. "The Enemy Inside" – 3:10
10. "Tumbling Down" – 5:25
11. "There's Always a Loser" – 4:38

== Personnel ==
- Danny Bowes – lead and backing vocals
- Luke Morley – guitars, keyboards and backing vocals
- Gary James – drums and percussion
- Ben Matthews – guitars and keyboards
- Chris Childs – bass guitar
- Lynne Jackaman – backing vocals, tambourine and featured vocals on "She Likes the Cocaine"
- Heather Findlay – backing vocals
- Susie Webb – backing vocals

Production

- Josh Tyrell – studio assistance
- Jon Constantine – studio assistance
- Joe Coghlan-Allen – studio assistance

== Charts ==
Chart (2017)	Peak position
Austrian Albums (Ö3 Austria)	43
Belgian Albums (Ultratop Flanders)	160
Belgian Albums (Ultratop Wallonia)	181
German Albums (Offizielle Top 100)	24
Scottish Albums (OCC)	2
Swedish Hard Rock Albums (Sverigetopplistan)	19
Swiss Albums (Schweizer Hitparade)	27
UK Albums (OCC)	3
UK Rock & Metal Albums (OCC)	1
