= Behind Closed Doors (Thunder album) =

Studio album by Thunder
- Released: 23 January 1995
- Recorded: 20 May – 12 August 1994
- Studios: Southern Tracks (Atlanta, Georgia); Rumbo Recorders (Los Angeles, California); Jacobs Studios (Farnham, England); Armoury Studios (Vancouver, British Columbia); Record Plant (Los Angeles, California)
- Genres: Hard rock; heavy metal
- Length: 57:45
- Label: EMI
- Producers: Mike Fraser; Luke Morley

Thunder studio album chronology
Laughing on Judgement Day (1992)	Behind Closed Doors (1995)	The Thrill of It All (1996)

Singles from Behind Closed Doors
- 1. "Stand Up" Released: 28 December 1994; 2. "River of Pain" Released: 13 February 1995; 3. "Castles in the Sand" Released: 24 April 1995

Behind Closed Doors is the third studio album by English hard rock band Thunder. Recorded between May and August 1994 at various studios, primarily Southern Tracks in Atlanta, Georgia, it was produced the band's lead guitarist Luke Morley and Mike Fraser, the latter of whom also mixed the album at the Record Plant in Los Angeles, California. The album was released on 23 January 1995 by EMI Records in Europe and Japan, and was not released in the United States.

Following the departure of the band's original bassist Mark "Snake" Luckhurst in December 1992, Behind Closed Doors is the first (and only) Thunder album to feature his replacement Mikael "Micke" Höglund, who joined in February 1993. All five band members, as well as former producer Andy Taylor, contributed to the writing of the material on the album, which also featured a wide range of additional guest musicians. Behind Closed Doors peaked at number 5 on the UK Albums Chart.

Behind Closed Doors was promoted on the Behind Closed Doors Tour beginning in April 1995, which included shows in the UK, Europe and Japan, as well as a number of festival dates. Three singles were released from the album, all of which reached the top 40 of the UK Singles Chart – "Stand Up" peaked at number 23, "River of Pain" peaked at number 31 and "Castles in the Sand" peaked at number 30. All three singles also reached the UK Rock & Metal Singles Chart top five.

== Recording and production ==
After recording some initial demos of new material in London, Thunder began pre-production on their third studio album on 6 May 1994 at Stanbridge Studios in Haywards Heath, West Sussex. Mike Fraser, who had previously mixed the band's debut album Backstreet Symphony in 1990, returned as the main producer for Behind Closed Doors alongside the band's lead guitarist and primary songwriter Luke Morley (Fraser also engineered and mixed the record). On 23 May, the band flew out to Atlanta, Georgia to begin recording of the new album at Southern Tracks. Speaking about the decision to record the album in the United States, Morley explained that it was "a last-ditch attempt to motivate Geffen", the band's American record label, who he claimed had failed to support previous release Laughing on Judgement Day. However, the band's A&R representative John Kalodner later left Geffen for Sony Music Entertainment, and the album was ultimately not released in the US.

Most of the recording for Behind Closed Doors was completed at Southern Tracks in Atlanta, although additional recording continued at Rumbo Recorders in Los Angeles, California throughout June and July. Bassist Mikael "Micke" Höglund, who had joined the band the previous year, recalls that "The drums and bass were supposed to be recorded at Southern Track Studios in Atlanta, but our guitar tech was a big dope smoker and completely useless. When I asked him to set up my bass to make it as easy to play as possible ... he loosened the bolts that hold the neck to the body so that the strings and the fretboard were closer together", which resulted in his instrument being out of tune for the sessions. Guitarist and keyboardist Ben Matthews praised Höglund's contributions to the album, suggesting that "His love of Geezer Butler and all things Black Sabbath was reflected in his playing and his songwriting contributions to Behind Closed Doors, giving it a darker and heavier feel."

Recording of Behind Closed Doors was completed with additional sessions at Jacobs Studios in Farnham, Surrey, Armoury Studios in Vancouver, British Columbia, and the Record Plant in Los Angeles. The album was later mixed by Fraser at the Record Plant in July 1994, and mastered by George Marino at Sterling Sound in New York City, New York. Recording of Behind Closed Doors was completed by 12 August 1994, according to the album's liner notes.

== Promotion and release ==
"Stand Up" was released as the first single from Behind Closed Doors on 28 December 1994, accompanied by a music video filmed during a show at the Shepherd's Bush Empire in London three weeks earlier. The single debuted at number 23 on the UK Singles Chart and number 2 on the UK Rock & Metal Singles Chart, behind Van Halen's "Don't Tell Me (What Love Can Do)". "River of Pain" was issued as the album's second single on 13 February 1995, debuting at number 31 on the UK Singles Chart and number 5 on the UK Rock & Metal Singles Chart, and "Castles in the Sand" was released as the third and final single from the record on 24 April 1995, reaching number 30 on the UK Singles Chart and number 2 on the UK Rock & Metal Singles Chart.

Behind Closed Doors was released on 23 January 1995 in Europe by EMI Records, and two days later in Japan by Toshiba EMI. Prior to the album's release, Thunder completed the short Stand Up and Be Counted Tour, which visited a number of UK cities in December 1994. The opening European leg of the Behind Closed Doors Tour began on 5 April 1995 in Hamburg, Germany and wrapped up on 12 May at London's Hammersmith Apollo. The band supported Bon Jovi alongside acts including Van Halen and Slash's Snakepit in June and July, and later toured Japan in late-August.

== Commercial reception ==
Upon its release, Behind Closed Doors debuted at number 5 on the UK Albums Chart, its peak position, and topped the UK Rock & Metal Albums Chart. It remained in the UK top 40 for three weeks and the top 100 for a total of six weeks, and later returned to the chart for two weeks in May. The album also reached the top 20 of the Scottish Albums Chart, peaking at number 18. Outside of the UK, Behind Closed Doors reached number 56 on the German Albums Chart, number 22 on the Swedish Albums Chart, and number 44 on the Swiss Albums Chart.

== Critical reception ==
Professional ratings
Review scores
Source	Rating
AllMusic	3.5/5 stars
Record Collector	3/5 stars

Reviewing the album for AllMusic, Eduardo Rivadavia praised Behind Closed Doors for featuring "accessible, yet commendably earthy melodic rock nuggets", as well as crediting the band for experimenting with different styles by noting that "Thunder also embraced slightly darker vibes with memorable results ... got the funk out successfully ... and noticeably toned down over all pomp rock thresholds". Rivadavia also credited the band for "sticking to their guns" despite hard rock and heavy metal music becoming markedly less successful with the continued increase in popularity of genres such as grunge and alternative rock. In a review of the remastered edition of the album for Record Collector, William Pinfold also noted that Behind Closed Doors was released in "an awkward time for the band and traditional hard rock in general", but nonetheless praised the record as "an impressively confident and mature recording". Pinfold suggested that Behind Closed Doors is "a touch less essential" than Thunder's first two albums, but also highlighted the bonus disc for making the album "an essential purchase for many fans".

== Track listing ==
No.	Title	Writer(s)	Length
1.	"Moth to the Flame"	Luke Morley; Andy Taylor; Mikael Höglund	5:27
2.	"Fly on the Wall"	Morley	4:21
3.	"I'll Be Waiting"	Morley	4:24
4.	"River of Pain"	Morley	3:40
5.	"Future Train"	Morley; Gary "Harry" James; Ben Matthews; Höglund	5:26
6.	"'Til the River Runs Dry"	Morley; James	4:20
7.	"Stand Up"	Morley; James	4:00
8.	"Preaching from a Chair"	Morley	6:17
9.	"Castles in the Sand"	Morley	4:43
10.	"Too Scared to Live"	Morley	4:25
11.	"Ball and Chain"	Morley; Danny Bowes; James; Matthews	4:48
12.	"It Happened in This Town"	Morley; James	5:54
Total length:			57:45

2010 remastered edition bonus disc
No.	Title	Writer(s)	Length
1.	"Low Life in High Places" (live at Hammersmith)	Morley	5:09
2.	"Move On"	Morley	4:01
3.	"Everybody Wants Her" (live)	Morley; James; Bowes; Matthews	4:52
4.	"Does It Feel Like Love" (live)	Morley	5:09
5.	"You Don't Know What Love Is" (demo)	Morley	5:19
6.	"River of Pain" (live acoustic)	Morley	3:31
7.	"Stand Up" (live acoustic)	Morley; James	3:23
8.	"Castles in the Sand" (live acoustic)	Morley	4:08
9.	"Move Over" (live Janis Joplin cover)	Janis Joplin	4:46
10.	"One Pretty Woman"	Morley; James; Matthews	3:32
11.	"The Fire Is Gone"	Morley	4:32
12.	"Life in a Day"	Morley	3:33
13.	"In a Broken Dream" (Python Lee Jackson cover)	David Bentley (journalist)	4:05
14.	"Love Walked In" (live)	Morley	7:30
15.	"Dirty Love" (demo)	Morley	5:11
16.	"Stay with Me" (Faces cover)	Rod Stewart; Ronnie Wood	5:26
Total length:			74:07

== Personnel ==
Thunder
- Danny Bowes – vocals
- Luke Morley – guitar, production
- Ben Matthews – guitar, keyboards
- Mikael Höglund – bass
- Gary "Harry" James – drums

Additional musicians

- Tom Keenlyside – tenor saxophone, horn arrangements
- Paul Baron – trumpet
- Derry Byrne – trumpet
- Bill Runge – baritone saxophone
- Christopher Roze – string arrangements
- Bruce Dukov – violin
- Sheldon Sanov – violin
- Denyse Nadeau Buffum – viola
- Suzie Katayama – cello
- Peter Lockett – percussion
- Hazza Ling Hoi – percussion
- The Rattling Monk – percussion
- The Suntan Sisters – backing vocals
- Tessa Niles – backing vocals (track 10)
- Katie Kissoon – backing vocals (track 10)

Production personnel

- Mike Fraser – production, engineering, mixing
- Johnny Q – engineering assistance
- Carym de Costanzo – engineering assistance
- Dick Kaneshiro – engineering assistance
- Ben Stark – engineering assistance
- Delwyn Brooks – engineering assistance
- Kyle Bess – engineering assistance
- Ross Stieglitz – engineering assistance
- Brian Pollack – engineering assistance
- George Marino – mastering

Artwork personnel

- Peter Curzon – artwork
- Storm Thorgerson – artwork
- Julien Mills – artwork assistance
- Tony May – photography
- Catherine Wessel – band photography
- Jonathan Rice - Actor on album cover

== Charts ==
Chart (1995)	Peak position
German Albums (Offizielle Top 100)	56
Scottish Albums (Official Charts)	18
Swedish Albums (Sverigetopplistan)	22
Swiss Albums (Schweizer Hitparade)	44
UK Albums (Official Charts)	5
UK Rock & Metal Albums (Official Charts)	1

Chart (2023)	Peak position
UK Independent Albums (Official Charts)	13

== Certifications ==
Certifications for Behind Closed Doors
Region	Certification	Certified units/sales
United Kingdom (BPI)	Silver	60,000^{‡}
^{‡} Sales+streaming figures based on certification alone.

== Bibliography ==
- McIver, Joel (October 2016), Giving the Game Away: The Thunder Story, London, England: Omnibus Press (published 11 November 2016), ISBN 978-1785581373
