= Please Remain Seated =

Studio album by Thunder
- Released: 18 January 2019
- Studio: Rockfield Studios (Monmouth, Wales)
- Genre: Hard rock; heavy metal
- Length: 63:14
- Label: earMusic
- Producer: Luke Morley

Thunder studio album chronology
Rip It Up (2017)	Please Remain Seated (2019)	All the Right Noises (2021)

Please Remain Seated is the twelfth studio album by English hard rock band Thunder. Recorded in late 2018 at Rockfield Studios in Monmouth, Wales, it was produced by the band's lead guitarist Luke Morley and released internationally by earMusic on 18 January 2019.

The album contains tracks that are a major reworking of songs from the band's back catalogue rather than brand new material.

Please Remain Seated debuted at number 8 on the UK Albums Chart, continuing the band's recent run of top 10 albums in the 2010s.

== Recording and production ==
Inspiration for the album came from the band working on their track "Love Walked In" as a B-side for their Christmas 2017 single.

The title for the album reflects the mood of the music contained on the album, which is of a softer nature than many of their traditional tracks.

== Critical reception ==
Professional ratings
Review scores
Source	Rating
Maximum Volume Music	8.5/10

Andy Thorley of Maximum Volume Music gave the album a positive review, stating in conclusion "That really, exemplifies why this was always going to work. Thunder aren't afraid to take chances. Other bands have tried this sort of thing, and it's been something that no one but them could enjoy. "Please Remain Seated", however is the sound of one of the finest bands we have pleasing themselves but also having the skill to take everyone else along for the ride too.”

== Commercial performance ==
Please Remain Seated debuted at number 8 on the UK Albums Chart.

== Track listing ==
All tracks are written by Luke Morley, except where noted.

CD1
No.	Title	Length
1.	"Bigger Than Both of Us"	4:09
2.	"Future Train" (Written by Morley/James/Matthews/Hógland)	6:10
3.	"Girl's Going Out of Her Head"	4:40
4.	"I'm Dreaming Again"	4:19
5.	"Fly on the Wall"	5:50
6.	"Just Another Suicide" (Written by Morley/James)	3:58
7.	"Empty City" (Written by Morley/Taylor)	6:15
8.	"Miracle Man"	5:29
9.	"Blown Away"	4:47
10.	"Loser"	6:18
11.	"She's So Fine" (Written by Morley/Taylor)	5:24
12.	"Low Life in High Places"	5:55
Total length:		63:14

CD2
No.	Title	Length
1.	"Stand Up" (Written by Morley/James)	3:33
2.	"River of Pain"	4:38
3.	"Like a Satellite"	4:56
4.	"Robert Johnson's Tombstone"	4:05
5.	"Higher Ground"	4:43
6.	"Everybody Wants Her" (Written by Morley/Bowes/Matthews/James)	5:19
7.	"Long Way from Home"	6:25
Total length:		33:39

== Personnel ==
- Danny Bowes – vocals
- Luke Morley – guitars, keyboards, backing vocals, production
- Chris Childs – bass guitar
- Gary "Harry" James – drums, percussion
- Ben Matthews - guitar & keyboards
- Tom Oliver – keyboards
- Emily Lynn – backing vocals
- Lara Smiles – backing vocals

== Charts ==
Chart performance for Please Remain Seated
Chart (2019)	Peak position
Belgian Albums (Ultratop Wallonia)	183
German Albums (Offizielle Top 100)	44
Scottish Albums (OCC)	4
Swiss Albums (Schweizer Hitparade)	50
UK Albums (OCC)	8
UK Independent Albums (OCC)	1
