= Laughing on Judgement Day =

Studio album by Thunder
- Released: 24 August 1992
- Recorded: 3 February 1992 – 24 June 1992
- Studio: Outside (Checkendon, England)
- Genre: Hard rock; heavy metal
- Length: 69:06
- Label: EMI
- Producer: Luke Morley; Andy Taylor

Thunder studio album chronology
Backstreet Symphony (1990)	Laughing on Judgement Day (1992)	Behind Closed Doors (1995)

Singles from Laughing on Judgement Day
- 1. "Low Life in High Places" Released: 3 August 1992; 2. "Everybody Wants Her" Released: 10 October 1992; 3. "A Better Man" Released: 1 February 1993; 4. "Like a Satellite" Released: 7 June 1993

Laughing on Judgement Day is the second studio album by English hard rock band Thunder. Recorded between February and June 1992 at Outside Studios in Checkendon, it was produced the band's lead guitarist Luke Morley and Andy Taylor (who had produced the band's debut Backstreet Symphony), then mixed by David Bascombe at AIR Studios in London. The album was released on 24 August 1992 by EMI Records in Europe and Japan, and by Geffen Records in the United States.

The material on Laughing on Judgement Day was written primarily by Morley, although three tracks were co-written by drummer Gary "Harry" James (two of which were also credited to vocalist Danny Bowes and guitarist Ben Matthews), while Taylor also co-wrote two songs. The album received positive reviews from a number of critics and peaked at number 2 on the UK Albums Chart, receiving a gold certification from the British Phonographic Industry for sales in excess of 100,000 units.

Laughing on Judgement Day was promoted on the Laughing All Over the World Tour beginning in October 1992, which included shows supporting Extreme and headline dates in the UK, Japan, Canada and Europe. Four singles were released from the album, all of which reached the top 40 of the UK Singles Chart – "Low Life in High Places" peaked at number 22, "Everybody Wants Her" peaked at number 36, "A Better Man" peaked at number 18 and "Like a Satellite" peaked at number 28.

== Recording and production ==
Recording for Thunder's second album started on 3 February 1992 at Outside Studios (now Hookend Recording Studios) in Checkendon, South Oxfordshire. Andy Taylor was asked to return as producer following his work on the band's 1990 debut Backstreet Symphony, but due to other commitments he only produced part of the album, with the rest produced by the band's lead guitarist Luke Morley. According to drummer Gary "Harry" James, Taylor "had a lot of other things on his mind at the time: he spent a lot of time on the phone to his other business interests, and we felt that his mind wasn't quite on the job". Taylor recalls that the album was produced "in a different way" to its predecessor due to the "more refined" nature of the songs, as well describing engineer Mike Fraser's lack of involvement as "difficult because we'd been such a team on the first album". Mixing of Laughing on Judgement Day began on 4 June at AIR Studios in London, and by 24 June the album was complete.

Unlike Backstreet Symphony, which featured only the band members and a single guitar part from Taylor, Laughing on Judgement Day includes performances by a number of guest musicians – Jody Linscott performed percussion on "Empty City", "The Moment of Truth" and "Like a Satellite"; the International Singing Criminals performed backing vocals on "Everybody Wants Her" and "Flawed to Perfection"; the Big Bad Horns (Grant Kirkhope, Frank Mizen and Snake Davis) performed brass on "Everybody Wants Her"; and Brother Lucius and Friar Don Jose performed backing vocals on "Empty City". The album also featured more songwriting credits than its predecessor, with band members Danny Bowes, Ben Matthews and Gary "Harry" James, as well as producer Taylor, all joining Morley on a number of songs. "The Moment of Truth" is the only Thunder song written without Morley, who jokingly recalls that "Obviously, the trauma of writing together was enough to stop them doing it again!"

== Promotion and release ==
"Low Life in High Places" was released as the first single from Laughing on Judgement Day on 3 August 1992, accompanied by a music video filmed in June "on the roof of a disused factory in London". The single debuted at number 25 on the UK Singles Chart and peaked the following week at number 22. "Low Life in High Places" was also the first Thunder single to chart in the Netherlands and New Zealand, where it reached number 47 and number 44, respectively. "Everybody Wants Her" was issued as the album's second single on 10 October, peaking at number 36 in its second week on the UK Singles Chart. "A Better Man" was released on 1 February 1993, becoming the first (and to date, only) Thunder single to reach the top 20 in the UK when it debuted at number 18. Fourth and final single "Like a Satellite" reached number 28 on the UK Singles Chart. "Does It Feel Like Love?" was also issued as a single in 1992, but was released in the United States only and did not chart.

Laughing on Judgement Day was released on 24 August 1992, by EMI Records in Europe and Geffen Records in the United States. The Japanese release followed four days later through Toshiba EMI. Prior to the release of the album, Thunder opened for Iron Maiden on the five-date South American leg of their Fear of the Dark Tour. James has described the tour as "a hell of an eye-opener", while Morley has commented that "I don't know if we were the right band to tour with Maiden ... I think the fans wanted a band who were quite a bit heavier than we were". After the group's second performance at Monsters of Rock on 22 August, the opening UK leg of the Laughing All Over the World Tour commenced in Belfast, Northern Ireland on 1 October. The tour included a stint supporting Extreme in Europe in November, as well as headline dates in Japan in December (bassist Mark "Snake" Luckhurst's final tour with the band), Canada in March 1993, and Europe through until May.

== Commercial reception ==
Upon its release, Laughing on Judgement Day debuted at number 2 on the UK Albums Chart, behind only Kylie Minogue's Greatest Hits. It remained in the top 40 for a total of six weeks and the top 100 for a total of ten. The album was certified silver by the British Phonographic Industry (BPI) in September 1992 and gold in January 1993, indicating sales of 100,000 units. Laughing on Judgement Day was the band's first album to chart in several European regions, including Germany (where it peaked at number 80), Sweden (where it peaked at number 37) and Switzerland (where it peaked at number 33).

== Critical reception ==
Professional ratings
Review scores
Source	Rating
AllMusic	4.5/5 stars

Reviewing the album for AllMusic, Eduardo Rivadavia awarded Laughing on Judgement Day four and a half out of five stars, claiming that it was "anything but a slump, and may in fact have been the strongest all-around effort of the group's career". Rivadavia highlighted many songs, including "The Moment of Truth" and "Today the World Stopped Turning" for their "massive, irresistible choruses", and "Low Life in High Places" and "Empty City" for their "stunning showcases" of Bowes's "soulful voice". However, despite praising the album, the writer concluded that "even though there was not a single obvious clunker among Laughing on Judgement Day's 14 tracks, Thunder's sound was sadly already yesterday's news, and the band would never again replicate the achievements of its early career".

== Track listing ==
No.	Title	Writer(s)	Length
1.	"Does It Feel Like Love?"	Luke Morley	4:59
2.	"Everybody Wants Her"	Morley; Danny Bowes; Ben Matthews; Gary "Harry" James	4:30
3.	"Low Life in High Places"	Morley	4:09
4.	"Laughing on Judgement Day"	Morley	4:39
5.	"Empty City"	Morley; Andy Taylor	6:55
6.	"Today the World Stopped Turning"	Morley	4:44
7.	"Long Way from Home"	Morley	6:02
8.	"Fire to Ice"	Morley; James	4:34
9.	"Feeding the Flame"	Morley	4:32
10.	"A Better Man"	Morley	3:40
11.	"The Moment of Truth"	Bowes; Matthews; James	3:54
12.	"Flawed to Perfection"	Morley	4:55
13.	"Like a Satellite"	Morley	4:48
14.	"Baby I'll Be Gone"	Morley; Taylor	6:49
Total length:			69:06

2009 remastered edition disc two
No.	Title	Writer(s)	Length
1.	"She's My Inspiration"	Morley	4:27
2.	"With a Little Help from My Friends" (The Beatles cover)	John Lennon; Paul McCartney	5:39
3.	"Low Life in High Places" (demo)	Morley	4:01
4.	"Everybody Wants Her" (radio edit)	Morley; Bowes; Matthews; James	4:20
5.	"Dirty Love" (acoustic version)	Morley	3:52
6.	"Higher Ground" (acoustic version)	Morley	3:32
7.	"Like a Satellite" (live)	Morley	5:55
8.	"Gimme Shelter" (The Rolling Stones cover)	Mick Jagger; Keith Richards	4:43
9.	"The Damage Is Done"	Morley	5:41
10.	"Higher Ground" (live)	Morley	5:37
11.	"Lazy Sunday Afternoon" (live Small Faces cover)	Steve Marriott; Ronnie Lane	3:33
12.	"Bigger Than Both of Us"	Morley	4:28
13.	"Dangerous Rhythm"	Morley	4:24
14.	"Everybody Wants Her" (preacher fade)	Morley; Bowes; Matthews; James	4:55
15.	"New York, New York: Harry's Theme" (live Liza Minnelli cover)	John Kander; Fred Ebb	5:00
Total length:			70:07

== Personnel ==
Thunder
- Danny Bowes – vocals
- Luke Morley – guitar, acoustic guitar (tracks 1, 3, 6, 7, 10, 11 and 13), backing vocals (tracks 3, 6, 8, 10 and 11), harmonica (tracks 10 and 14), piano (track 11), slide guitar (track 14), production
- Ben Matthews – guitar, organ (tracks 1, 3, 6–9 and 13), piano (tracks 5–7 and 12), twelve-string guitar (track 14), additional engineering
- Mark "Snake" Luckhurst – bass, acoustic bass (track 10)
- Gary "Harry" James – drums, percussion, backing vocals (track 11), acoustic guitar (track 10)

Additional musicians

- Jody Linscott – percussion (tracks 5, 11 and 13)
- International Singing Criminals – backing vocals (tracks 2 and 12)
- The Big Bad Horns – brass (track 2)
- Snake Davis – saxophone (track 2)
- Mo Hepple – backing vocal arrangements (track 2)
- Brother Lucius – backing vocals (track 5)
- Friar Don Jose – backing vocals (track 5)

Production personnel

- Andy Taylor – production
- Ken Lomas – engineering
- Andy Baker – engineering assistance
- Lee Philips – engineering assistance
- Adrian Moore – engineering assistance
- Ian Huffam – engineering assistance
- Andy Strange – engineering assistance
- David Bascombe – mixing

Artwork personnel

- Storm Thorgerson – artwork
- Keith Breeden – artwork
- Jill Furmanovsky – photography
- Rupert Truman – photography
- Tony May – photography
- Greg Fulginiti – mastering
- Dave Donnelly – mastering assistance

== Charts ==
Chart (1992)	Peak position
German Albums (Offizielle Top 100)	80
Swedish Albums (Sverigetopplistan)	37
Swiss Albums (Schweizer Hitparade)	33
UK Albums (OCC)	2

Chart (2023)	Peak position
Scottish Albums (OCC)	19
UK Independent Albums (OCC)	12
UK Rock & Metal Albums (OCC)	5

== Certifications ==
Region	Certification	Certified units/sales
United Kingdom (BPI)	Gold	100,000^{^}
^{^} Shipments figures based on certification alone.

== Bibliography ==
- McIver, Joel (October 2016), Giving the Game Away: The Thunder Story, London, England: Omnibus Press (published 11 November 2016), ISBN 978-1785581373
