= The Thrill of It All =

The Thrill of It All may refer to:

Films:

- The Thrill of It All (film), a 1963 film starring Doris Day and James Garner.

Albums:

- The Thrill of It All (Roxy Music album), 1995
- The Thrill of It All (Thunder album), 1996
- The Thrill of It All (Sam Smith album), 2017

Songs:

- "The Thrill of It All" (song), a song by Roxy Music from Country Life
- "The Thrill of It All", a song by Black Sabbath from Sabotage
- "The Thrill of It All", a song by Thunder from The Thrill of It All
