= Backstreet Symphony =

Studio album by Thunder
- Released: 5 March 1990
- Recorded: August–September 1989
- Studio: Great Linford Manor Studios (Milton Keynes, England)
- Genre: Hard rock
- Length: 51:32
- Label: EMI
- Producer: Andy Taylor

Thunder studio album chronology
Backstreet Symphony (1990)	Laughing on Judgement Day (1992)

Singles from Backstreet Symphony
- 1. "She's So Fine" Released: 30 October 1989; 2. "Dirty Love" Released: 5 February 1990; 3. "Backstreet Symphony" Released: 30 April 1990; 4. "Gimme Some Lovin'" Released: 2 July 1990; 5. "Love Walked In" Released: 11 February 1991

Alternate cover
- Japanese and US reissue cover

Backstreet Symphony is the debut studio album by English hard rock band Thunder. Recorded in 1989 at Great Linford Manor Studios in Milton Keynes, it was produced by former Duran Duran and The Power Station guitarist Andy Taylor, then mixed by Mike Fraser at AIR Studios in London. The album was initially released on 5 March 1990 by EMI Records in the UK and Capitol Records in the US, and was later re-released the following year in the US by Geffen Records.

The material on Backstreet Symphony was written primarily by the band's lead guitarist Luke Morley, with two songs co-written by Taylor and one cover version included. The album received positive reviews from a number of critics and peaked at number 21 on the UK Albums Chart, receiving a gold certification from the British Phonographic Industry for sales in excess of 100,000 units. Upon its 1991 re-release, the album registered at number 114 on the US Billboard 200.

Backstreet Symphony was promoted on a worldwide tour beginning in February 1990, which included shows in Europe supporting Heart, Love/Hate and ZZ Top, as well as dates in North America. Five singles were released from the album, all of which reached the top 40 of the UK Singles Chart – "Dirty Love" peaked at number 32, "Backstreet Symphony" at number 25, "Gimme Some Lovin'" at number 36, "She's So Fine" at number 34 and "Love Walked In" at number 21.

== Recording and production ==
Thunder began recording their debut studio album with producer Andy Taylor and engineer Mike Fraser on 7 August 1989. Sessions took place at the Great Linford Manor in Milton Keynes, and were described by the band's rhythm guitarist/keyboardist Ben Matthews as "like being at a party where an album broke out every now and then" due to the group's excessive drinking habits. Taylor recalls that the recording process was "uplifting" and "special", suggesting that they comprised "60 per cent laughing, 20 per cent drinking, [and] 20 per cent work". Drummer Gary "Harry" James also recollected the band's tendency to drink during the Backstreet Symphony recording, admitting that "We did a ridiculous amount of partying" and suggesting that it was "The booziest time" of his career. The album was mixed at AIR Studios.

== Promotion and release ==
"She's So Fine" was released as the lead single from Thunder's upcoming debut album on 30 October 1989. "Dirty Love" followed on 5 February 1990, debuting as the band's first UK Singles Chart top 40 and peaking the following week at number 32. The band's third single, for the album's title track, was issued in April and debuted at number 25 on the UK Singles Chart. "Gimme Some Lovin'" was released as the fourth single from the album on 2 July, peaking at number 36 in the UK; "She's So Fine" was reissued in September and peaked at number 34; and "Love Walked In" was released as the final UK single from the album on 11 February 1991, reaching a peak chart position of number 21. In the United States, "Dirty Love", "Until My Dying Day" and "Love Walked In" were issued as singles in 1991. "Dirty Love" registered at number 55 on the Billboard Hot 100 and number 10 on the Mainstream Rock Songs chart, while "Until My Dying Day" and "Love Walked In" also reached the Mainstream Rock top 50.

Backstreet Symphony was first released on 5 March 1990 in the UK by EMI Records. The initial North American release by Capitol Records followed on 9 April. Thunder left Capitol in 1991, as they were "notorious at the time for not supporting acts signed to EMI in the UK" according to journalist Mick Wall, and signed with Geffen Records. The album was re-released in North America on 15 April 1991 with a different album cover. After its initial release in Japan on 24 April, on 21 June Backstreet Symphony was issued by Toshiba EMI featuring the new album cover and a bonus disc of live recordings. At the end of 1990, a video album entitled Backstreet Symphony: The Videos was released featuring the band's first four music videos and four live performances from the band's set at Monsters of Rock earlier in the year.

Thunder toured worldwide in promotion of their debut album. The Backstreet Symphony Tour commenced on 22 February 1990 in Dublin, Ireland, with the opening UK leg running until 1 April, before also ending in Dublin. The band supported Heart on a run of shows in Europe and the UK between 25 April and 13 May, and later opened for Love/Hate in Germany and the Netherlands in July. On 18 August, Thunder appeared for the first time at the Monsters of Rock festival, performing in front of their biggest crowd of approximately 80,000 people. The band's headline tour continued in October with another European leg of shows, returning to the UK for the remainder of the year. Touring continued into 1991 with festival appearances, a support slot for ZZ Top, and shows in the United States and Canada.

== Artwork and concept ==
The concept for the Backstreet Symphony album cover was originally proposed by guitarist and songwriter Luke Morley, who asked his mother Christine Morley to produce an initial sketch of the scene. The cover depicts James, a "tramp" and a female in an alleyway, photographed by Andy Earle in London's Artillery Passage. Bassist Mark "Snake" Luckhurst described the artwork as "An example of Thunder's take-no-prisoners attitude", recalling that while the EMI Records marketing team opposed its lack of inclusion of the band, "The band put their foot down and said no. They liked the concept and said they wanted to stick with it".

== Commercial reception ==
Upon its initial release, Backstreet Symphony debuted at number 21 on the UK Albums Chart, its peak position. It remained in the top 40 for one more week, before dropping out of the top 100 at the end of a four-week run. The album re-entered the chart for three weeks in May, and later returned to for a week in July, three weeks in September, and finally five weeks in March 1991 following the success of final single "Love Walked In". The album was certified silver by the British Phonographic Industry (BPI) in September 1990 and gold in May 1991, indicating sales of 100,000 units. Upon its release in the US, the album debuted at number 185 on the Billboard 200 for the week ending June 1, 1991, before peaking at number 114 and spending a total of ten weeks on the chart.

== Critical reception ==
Professional ratings
Review scores
Source	Rating
AllMusic	3/5 stars

Writing for Classic Rock magazine in 2002, journalist Dave Ling claimed that Backstreet Symphony was "greeted with critical rapture", calling it "one of the all-time great hard rock debuts". Reviewing the album for AllMusic, Alex Henderson praised it as "a decent hard rock offering that should have done better". Highlighting tracks such as "She's So Fine", "Loved Walked In" and the "inspired cover" of The Spencer Davis Group's "Gimme Some Lovin'", Henderson described the album's sound as "a mixture of Bad Company and Deep Purple", claiming that "while Thunder [weren't] the most original or groundbreaking band in the world, [they weren't] lacking when it came to spirit and enthusiasm". In The Encyclopedia of Popular Music, writer Colin Larkin hailed Backstreet Symphony as "a stunning album of bluesy rockers and atmospheric ballads", claiming that the songs on the album "received widespread critical acclaim for their dual guitar attack of alternating riffs and lead breaks".

Backstreet Symphony was featured at number 7 on the Kerrang! "Albums of the Year" feature for 1990, and in 2008 was voted the 84th best British rock album of all time by the magazine's readers.

== Track listing ==
No.	Title	Writer(s)	Length
1.	"She's So Fine"	Luke Morley; Andy Taylor	5:30
2.	"Dirty Love"	Morley	5:21
3.	"Don't Wait for Me"	Morley	5:32
4.	"Higher Ground"	Morley	5:06
5.	"Until My Dying Day"	Morley; Taylor	6:32
6.	"Backstreet Symphony"	Morley	4:30
7.	"Love Walked In"	Morley	6:25
8.	"An Englishman on Holiday"	Morley	4:27
9.	"Girl's Going Out of Her Head"	Morley	4:18
10.	"Gimme Some Lovin'" (The Spencer Davis Group cover)	Steve Winwood; Spencer Davis; Muff Winwood	3:51
Total length:			51:32

CD and cassette versions
No.	Title	Writer(s)	Length
11.	"Distant Thunder"	Morley	4:56
Total length:			56:28

1991 Japanese edition bonus disc
No.	Title	Writer(s)	Length
1.	"Another Shot of Love" (live at Opera on the Green, London, 16 July 1989)	Morley	3:29
2.	"Girl's Going Out of Her Head" (live at the Maritime Bar, Southend, 20 November 1989)	Morley	4:06
3.	"An Englishman on Holiday" (live at the Maritime Bar, Southend, 20 November 1989)	Morley	5:09
4.	"Until My Dying Day" (live at the Town & Country Club, London, 7 March 1990)	Morley; Taylor	7:02
5.	"Fired Up" (live at the Town & Country Club, London, 7 March 1990)	Morley	5:41
6.	"Dirty Love" (live at the Town & Country Club, London, 7 March 1990)	Morley	9:01
7.	"She's So Fine" (live at Monsters of Rock, Donington, 18 August 1990)	Morley; Taylor	6:29
8.	"Backstreet Symphony" (live at Monsters of Rock, Donington, 18 August 1990)	Morley	4:41
9.	"Higher Ground" (live at Monsters of Rock, Donington, 18 August 1990)	Morley	5:34
10.	"Don't Wait for Me" (live at Monsters of Rock, Donington, 18 August 1990)	Morley	7:26
Total length:			58:47

2009 remastered edition disc one bonus tracks
No.	Title	Writer(s)	Length
12.	"Dirty Love" (extended version)	Morley	5:31
13.	"Fired Up (Untiteled, Flexi-disc, 7", 33 ⅓ RPM, Single Sided, Single, A3)Jul., 12, 1989"	Morley	4:10
14.	"I Wanna Be Her Slave (Gimme Some Lovin', Vinyl, 7", Single, 45 RPM, B side )"	Morley; Taylor	4:26
15.	"She's So Fine" (full-length version)	Morley; Taylor	5:59
Total length:			76:34

2009 remastered edition disc two
No.	Title	Writer(s)	Length
1.	"Until the Night Is Through (Dance Dance Dance) (Vinyl, 10", Limited Edition, Numbered, Red)"	Morley	4:06
2.	"I Can Still Hear the Music ( B side, 'She's so fine", Vinyl, 7", 45 RPM, Single, 1990 )"	Morley	5:04
3.	"No Way Out of the Wilderness ( B sides," Back Street Symphony", Vinyl, 7", 45 RPM, Single, 1990)"	Morley	5:17
4.	"An Englishman on Holiday" (live)	Morley	5:12
5.	"Girl's Going Out of Her Head" (live)	Morley	4:09
6.	"Another Shot of Love" (live)	Morley	3:32
7.	"Backstreet Symphony" (live at the Town & Country Club)	Morley	4:44
8.	"She's So Fine" (live at the Town & Country Club)	Morley; Taylor	6:29
9.	"Until My Dying Day" (live at the Town & Country Club)	Morley; Taylor	7:26
10.	"Higher Ground" (live at the Town & Country Club)	Morley	5:31
11.	"Don't Wait for Me" (live at the Town & Country Club)	Morley	8:38
12.	"Fired Up" (live at the Town & Country Club)	Morley	5:47
13.	"Dirty Love" (live at the Town & Country Club)	Morley	8:56
Total length:			74:51

== Personnel ==
- Danny Bowes – vocals
- Luke Morley – guitar, cover concept
- Ben Matthews – guitar, piano, organ, engineering assistance
- Mark "Snake" Luckhurst – bass
- Gary "Harry" James – drums, percussion
- Andy Taylor – production, twelve-string guitar (track 5)
- Peter Peck – engineering assistance
- Russell Leahy – engineering assistance
- Andy Strange – engineering assistance
- Rupert Coulson – engineering assistance
- Mike Fraser – mixing
- Ian Cooper – mastering
- Greg Fulginiti – mastering (re-released version)
- The Complete Works – art direction
- Christine Morley – original artwork
- Andy Earl – photography
- Ross Halfin – photography (re-released version)
- Charlie Best – photography (re-released version)

== Charts ==
Chart (1990–1991)	Peak position
UK Albums (OCC)	21
US Billboard 200	114

Chart (2023)	Peak position
Scottish Albums (OCC)	14
UK Independent Albums (OCC)	12
UK Rock & Metal Albums (OCC)	4

== Certifications ==
Region	Certification	Certified units/sales
United Kingdom (BPI)	Gold	100,000^{^}
^{^} Shipments figures based on certification alone.

== Release history ==
Region	Date	Label	Format	Catalog
Europe	5 March 1990	EMI Records	Compact disc	CDEMC 3570
Europe	5 March 1990	EMI Records	LP record	EMC 3570
Europe	5 March 1990	EMI Records	Cassette	TCEMC 3570
United Kingdom	5 March 1990	EMI Records	Picture disc	EMCPD 3570
United States	9 April 1990	Capitol Records	Compact disc	CDP 7 93614 2
United States	9 April 1990	Capitol Records	LP record	C1-93614
United States	9 April 1990	Capitol Records	Cassette	CDP 7 93614 4
Canada	9 April 1990	EMI of Canada	Compact disc	C2 96649
United States	15 April 1991	Geffen Records	Compact disc	GEFD24384
United States	15 April 1991	Geffen Records	Cassette	GEFC24384
Japan	24 April 1991	Toshiba EMI	Compact disc	TOCP-6126
Japan	21 June 1991	Toshiba EMI	Double CD	TOCP-6729/30
Japan	9 October 1991	Toshiba EMI	Compact disc	TOCP-6966
Japan	24 March 1993	Toshiba EMI	Compact disc	TOCP-7633
Japan	23 July 1999	Toshiba EMI	Compact disc	TOCP-50774
Japan	9 March 2004	Toshiba EMI	Compact disc	TOCP-67581
Europe	6 July 2009	EMI Records	Double CD	964 803 2
Japan	29 January 2014	Warner Music Japan	Compact disc	WPCR-80062

== Bibliography ==
- Larkin, Colin (27 May 2011), The Encyclopedia of Popular Music, London, England: Omnibus Press, ISBN 978-0857125958
- McIver, Joel (11 November 2016), Giving the Game Away: The Thunder Story, London, England: Omnibus Press, ISBN 978-1785581373
