= Thunder (band) =

English hard rock band

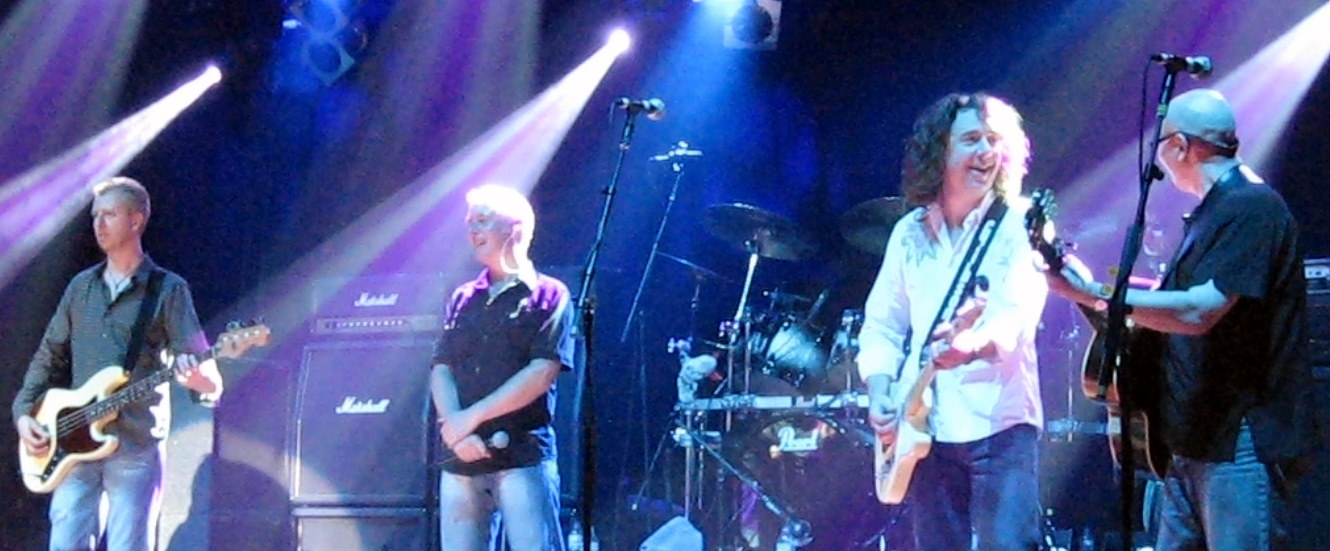
- Thunder performing in 2006. Left to right: Chris Childs, Danny Bowes, Ben Matthews and Harry James.

Background information
- Origin: London, England
- Genre: Hard rock
- Years active: 1989–2000; 2002–2009; 2011–present (on hiatus)
- Labels: earMusic; Frontiers; STC; Eagle; Castle; Victor; EMI; Geffen; Capitol; BMG
- Members: Danny Bowes; Luke Morley; Ben Matthews; Chris Childs; Gary "Harry" James
- Past members: Mark 'Snake' Luckhurst; Mikael Höglund
- Website: thunderonline.com

Thunder are an English hard rock band from London. Formed in 1989, the group was founded by former Terraplane members Danny Bowes (vocals), Luke Morley (guitar) and Gary "Harry" James (drums), along with second guitarist and keyboardist Ben Matthews and bassist Mark "Snake" Luckhurst. Originally signed to EMI Records in the UK, the band released their debut album Backstreet Symphony in 1990, which reached number 21 on the UK Albums Chart and number 114 on the US Billboard 200. The 1992 follow-up Laughing on Judgement Day reached number 2, while both albums were certified gold by the British Phonographic Industry (BPI). All nine singles released from the two albums reached the UK Singles Chart top 40.

Luckhurst left the band in late 1992, and was replaced the following February by former Great King Rat bassist Mikael Höglund. The new lineup recorded only one studio album, Behind Closed Doors, which peaked at number 5 in the UK and spawned three UK top 40 singles. The 1995 compilation Their Finest Hour (And a Bit) reached number 22 in the UK and was certified silver by the BPI. Höglund left in 1996 and was replaced by Chris Childs, after Morley performed bass on fourth album The Thrill of It All, which reached the UK top 20. Thunder's 1998 live album Live reached number 35 on the UK Albums Chart, while the following year's fifth studio album Giving the Game Away reached number 49. The band broke up in early 2000 due to "outside business forces".

After a brief hiatus, Thunder returned in 2002 and formed their own record label, STC Recordings. The band's sixth studio album Shooting at the Sun was released the following year, supported by the UK top 50 single "Loser". After three more new studio albums – 2005's The Magnificent Seventh, 2006's Robert Johnson's Tombstone and 2008's Bang! – Thunder decided to break up in 2009. Two years later, however, the group returned for a third active spell, scheduling a number of sporadic live shows over the following years. A tenth studio album, Wonder Days, was released on the earMusic label in 2015, giving the band their first UK top ten since 1995 when it peaked at number 9. Rip It Up followed in 2017, reaching a peak UK Albums Chart position of number 3.

== History ==
=== 1989–1991: Early years and debut studio album ===
On 1 January 1989, at the group's annual New Year's Day meeting, Terraplane was disbanded by vocalist Danny Bowes and guitarist Luke Morley, who decided to form a new band under the name Thunder. Later in the month, the pair recorded a number of demos at Great Linford Manor Studios in Milton Keynes with producer Andy Taylor and engineer Ben Matthews, as well as Terraplane drummer Gary "Harry" James, who was brought in after the initially planned drummer failed to attend. According to Morley, the band name was chosen as a combination of two elements: a song he had written called "Distant Thunder", and Taylor's debut solo album. Enlisting Bad Company's Steve Price to play bass temporarily (Morley played bass as well as guitar on the Linford Manor demos), the group invited a number of record labels to their rehearsals in London, and later signed with EMI in April. Mark "Snake" Luckhurst joined Thunder as the group's original bassist on 2 May 1989, having been recommended by James after the two had performed together in Hellfire Corner. The band's lineup was completed with the addition of Matthews, who had earlier played keyboards for Terraplane's last two shows and engineered Thunder's January demos. Thunder played their first live show on 13 July 1989 at the Reid's Club in Southend-on-Sea, the first date in a short run of seven UK dates dubbed "The Toilet Tour". In August the band returned to the Great Linford Manor to record their debut studio album, again working with Taylor as producer. The album was mixed at London's AIR Studios by Mike Fraser, who also engineered the record. "She's So Fine" was released as the first single from the upcoming album on 30 October, after which the band embarked on a 27-date tour of the UK and Ireland dubbed the "Static Discharge Tour", which included two shows supporting Aerosmith at the NEC Arena in Birmingham. "Dirty Love" was released in February 1990 and entered the UK Singles Chart at number 40, before peaking the following week at number 32. The band's debut album Backstreet Symphony was released on 5 March and entered the UK Albums Chart at its peak position of number 21. By 1991, it had been certified gold by the British Phonographic Industry (BPI). Four more tracks from Backstreet Symphony were later issued as singles – the title track, "Gimme Some Lovin'", a reissue of "She's So Fine", and "Love Walked In" – all of which reached the top 40 of the UK Singles Chart. Writing for Classic Rock magazine in 2002, journalist Dave Ling claimed that the album was "greeted with critical rapture", calling it "one of the all-time great hard rock debuts". AllMusic's Alex Henderson, however, proposed that while the record "wasn't lacking when it came to spirit and enthusiasm", it displayed Thunder as "[not] the most original or groundbreaking band in the world". Backstreet Symphony was featured at number 7 on the Kerrang! "Albums of the Year" feature for 1990, and in 2008 was voted by the magazine's readers to be the 84th best British rock album of all time. Backstreet Symphony was promoted on a UK tour running from late February through until the end of March, after which Thunder travelled to the United States to perform a pair of shows for American media and meet with EMI's sister label Capitol Records, who had originally released the album in the US. According to journalist Mick Wall, who had been travelling with Thunder for a number of months, "Capitol in America were notorious at the time for not supporting acts signed to EMI in the UK", which resulted in the band splitting with the label shortly after their meeting. Thunder continued touring in support of their debut album, including a stint supporting Heart in April and May, and another supporting Love/Hate in July, both in Europe. On 18 August they performed for the first time at Monsters of Rock, which was headlined by Whitesnake. After splitting with Capitol earlier in the year, the band signed a US deal with Geffen Records in September, who reissued Backstreet Symphony with a new cover the following April. In June 1991, the album peaked at number 114 on the Billboard 200. Singles "Dirty Love" and "Love Walked In" reached number 10 and number 31, respectively, on the Billboard Mainstream Rock chart.

=== 1991–1996: UK chart success and bassist change ===
After continuing to promote their debut album Backstreet Symphony in various regions around the world throughout 1991, Thunder began recording their second studio album on 3 February 1992 at Outside Studios, which was later mixed at AIR Studios in June. The band worked with producer Andy Taylor again, although the album was co-produced by Luke Morley. In July 1992, the band supported Iron Maiden on a tour of South America which visited Argentina, Uruguay and Brazil, before they performed at Monsters of Rock for the second time the following month, which was also headlined by Iron Maiden. Also in August, "Low Life in High Places" was released as the first single from the band's second album, reaching number 22 on the UK Singles Chart, before Laughing on Judgement Day itself was released and debuted at number 2 on the UK Albums Chart – the band's highest album chart position to date. The album was Thunder's second release to receive a gold certification from the BPI, which it did in January 1993. Later singles "Everybody Wants Her", "A Better Man" and "Like a Satellite" all registered on the UK Singles Chart top 40 ("A Better Man" peaked at number 18, the highest UK Singles Chart position for the band to date).

Thunder embarked on their Laughing All Over the World Tour on 1 October 1992, beginning with a run of 19 headline shows in the UK supported by Australian band The Screaming Jets. The band saw the year out supporting Extreme on a European tour in November, followed by a short run of dates in Japan in December. By the end of the year, Luckhurst had left the band. Morley has revealed that Luckhurst was sacked from the group, due to an incident in which the bassist threw a birthday cake at photographer Ross Halfin, after he requested for photos of only Morley and Bowes together. He was replaced the following February by Swedish bassist Mikael "Micke" Höglund, who was selected from a number of auditionees for the role including former Terraplane member Nick Linden, who claims he "got down to the last two candidates". The band continued touring throughout the rest of 1993, including a number of festival appearances in the summer, and later toured as their alter egos "Danny & the Doo Wops".

For their third studio album (and first with Höglund), Thunder primarily recorded at Southern Tracks in Atlanta and Rumbo Recorders in Los Angeles, with additional sessions taking place at Jacobs Studios in Farnham, Surrey, Armoury Studios in the Canadian city of Vancouver, British Columbia, and the Record Plant in Los Angeles, where the album was also mixed. Mike Fraser, who had previously engineered and mixed Backstreet Symphony, produced the album alongside Morley. "Stand Up" was released as the album's lead single in December 1994, peaking at number 23 on the UK Singles Chart. Behind Closed Doors followed on 23 January 1995, reaching a peak position of number 5 on the UK Albums Chart and receiving a silver certification from the BPI. "River of Pain" was issued as the album's second single in February, reaching number 31 in the UK, followed by "Castles in the Sand" in April which reached number 30. In June 1995, the band won the Kerrang! Award for Best British Live Act.

The Behind Closed Doors Tour commenced in Germany on 5 April 1995 and included shows in Europe, the UK and Japan, wrapping up on 1 September in Tokyo. Later that month, the band released their first compilation album, The Best of Thunder: Their Finest Hour (And a Bit), promoted by the new song "In a Broken Dream" which reached number 26 on the UK Singles Chart and topped the UK Rock & Metal Singles Chart. The album reached number 22 on the UK Albums Chart, number 3 on the UK Rock & Metal Albums Chart (behind AC/DC's Ballbreaker and One Hot Minute by Red Hot Chili Peppers), and was certified silver by the BPI. The compilation was promoted on Their Finest Set (And a Bit) Tour, which included five shows in five UK cities between 27 September and 2 October.

=== 1996–2002: Second bassist change and breakup ===
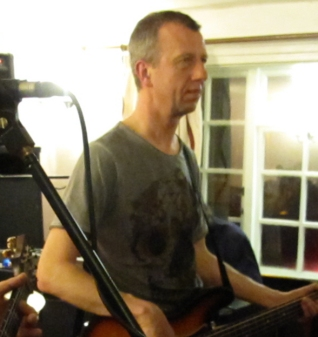
Chris Childs replaced Mikael "Micke" Höglund on bass in 1996, and remains with the band to the current day.

Morley, Matthews and James began writing new material with producer Taylor in January 1996, before entering the studio to record their fourth studio album in April. The album would be the band's first on their own B Lucky label, distributed by Castle Communications, with whom they signed in February that year. Recording took place at Rockfield Studios in Monmouthshire, Wales and saw Morley handling bass duties in addition to guitar due to the absence of Höglund as a result of "family commitments". The album was completed by the end of May, after which Höglund announced that he was to leave Thunder permanently; he was replaced in the autumn by Chris Childs, formerly of Then Jericho. The Thrill of It All was released in Japan on 1 September 1996 through JVC, but was delayed elsewhere due to Matthews's diagnosis of tendinitis, which prevented him from playing guitar. The album was eventually released outside of Japan in February 1997, reaching number 14 on the UK Albums Chart.

After a Japanese run in January, the Thrill of It All UK Tour started in February and was followed by European dates in March; additional UK shows postponed due to Matthews's injury were rescheduled for April. Some UK dates were pushed back due to Bowes suffering pneumonia and laryngitis, and in July he underwent surgery on his knee which signalled a short break for the group, during which time Childs and James featured in the rock musical Carnaby Street, while Morley toured with Taylor's band The Power Station. Thunder signed with Eagle Records in November 1997, who would release the band's first live album, simply titled Live, the following February. The album reached number 35 on the UK Albums Chart and spawned the top 40 single "The Only One". Live was recorded over the course of four shows in Wolverhampton and London between 12 and 16 November 1997, and were promoted on European and UK tours (in addition to a run supporting Status Quo) in the spring of 1998.

The band also returned to the studio in April 1998 to record their fifth studio album Giving the Game Away. The first preview of the album was released in the form of the single "Play That Funky Music" in June, which reached the UK Singles Chart top 40. "Just Another Suicide" (renamed "You Wanna Know" for the UK release) was issued as the second single from the album in March 1999, reaching number 49 on the UK Singles Chart, followed a week later by the album which reached the same position on the UK Albums Chart. The band toured the UK in promotion of the album through May and early June, before announcing later in the year that they were due to break up, issuing a statement which outlined that "After a great deal of exploration, discussion and soul searching, we have decided to split up. The reasons are many and complex, but to cut a long story short, we feel we have no choice. We must stress that this decision is due to outside business forces and not down to any personal or musical differences within the band." Speaking about the decision to disband Thunder, Bowes explained that "It was a matter of simple economics. We were finding it increasingly hard to find a record company that would allow us to compete", while Morley added that "There was no way to expand".

The UK Farewell Tour ran through December 1999, followed by a run in Japan the following March. The final Thunder show took place on 4 May at Dingwalls in London, and featured an acoustic set followed by a regular "electric" set. The final show was recorded for the live album They Think It's All Over... It Is Now, which was released in July 2000; the acoustic set was also later issued as They Think It's All Acoustic... It Is Now in May 2001. After Thunder's breakup, Morley released his debut solo album El Gringo Retro in March 2001, Bad Influence featuring James and Childs released their second studio album One Way Love in May 2001, James joined Magnum in February 2002, and Bowes and Morley released an album together entitled Moving Swiftly Along in May 2002, under the name "Bowes & Morley".

=== 2002–2009: Reformation and second active spell ===
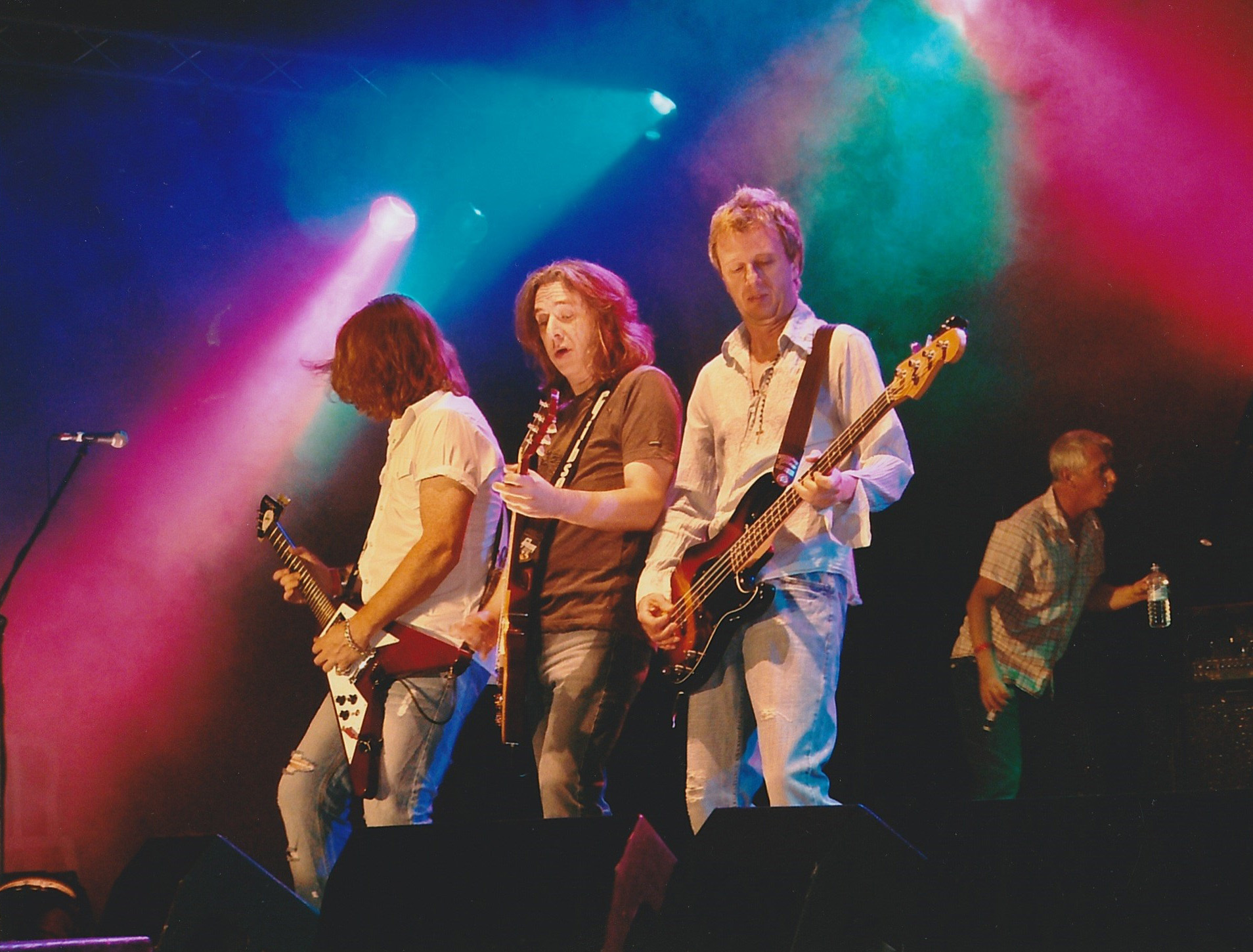
Thunder performing in 2005

In July 2002, it was announced that Thunder would be reuniting for a series of shows in November marketed under the Monsters of Rock brand. In a post online, Bowes confirmed the news, which had been leaked without permission, but reiterated that it would be "a non permanent reformation" which the band agreed to "as it gives us the ability to play again without having to commit to anything long-term". The band also began recording a new studio album in October, and in December formed their own record label, STC Recordings. STC stands for "Straight Talk Company", as Bowes says "I give you the news the same way; whether it's good or bad, I give it to you straight". Shooting at the Sun received a limited release online in March, and was later released throughout Europe in August by Frontiers Records. The album did not register on the UK Albums Chart, but did spawn the UK Singles Chart top 50 single "Loser". The band toured in promotion of the album throughout much of the rest of 2003, and early 2004.

Thunder recorded their seventh studio album between June and August 2004, as well as playing a number of European festivals in July. The album was recorded at Chapel Studios in South Thoresby, produced by Morley and engineered and mixed by Rupert Coulson. In November the band supported Deep Purple alongside Peter Frampton on a tour of the UK, before "I Love You More Than Rock 'n' Roll" was released as a single and reached number 27 on the UK Singles Chart. The Magnificent Seventh was released in the UK on 21 February 2005 and a day later in Europe, debuting at number 70 on the UK Albums Chart and number 5 on the UK Rock & Metal Albums Chart. The album was released a month later in Japan, and in mid-April internationally on iTunes. The Magnificent Seventh Tour started in the UK in March, followed by European dates in April and June, a Japanese leg running into July, a second string of shows in Europe in December, and a return to the UK the following January.

The band's eighth studio album, Robert Johnson's Tombstone, followed in October 2006, peaking at number 56 on the UK Albums Chart. The album's only single, "The Devil Made Me Do It", was the group's 18th (and to date, latest) single to reach the top 40 of the UK Singles Chart. Touring for the album commenced in the UK in November, followed by European shows in March 2007, a number of festival appearances in the summer, and three dates in Japan in September. In October 2007, the band released the first in a series of extended plays (EPs) – Six of One... – which featured three previously unreleased studio tracks and three live recordings from the UK tour the previous November. The follow-up, ...Half a Dozen of the Other, was issued in April 2008 and also featured three studio tracks and three live recordings. The third and final EP of the trilogy, The Joy of Six, was issued alongside the band's ninth studio album Bang! on 3 November 2008. The album reached number 62 on the UK Albums Chart.

In January 2009, after a short UK tour promoting Bang!, it was announced that Thunder were due to split up again. The band released a statement which explained that "we've found ourselves becoming increasingly busy with our various activities outside of the band, and we've come to the conclusion that there are simply not enough hours in the day to fit it all in", adding that they would complete scheduled tours in Europe in February and Japan in April, as well as adding a final run of UK shows in July. The final show of the UK tour, at the Hammersmith Apollo in London, was documented on the live video album At the End of the Road: Live in London, 11 July 2009 released later in the year. The band's final shows took place at Rock of Ages and Sonisphere Festival on 31 July and 1 August, respectively.

=== 2009–2022: Hiatus and return ===
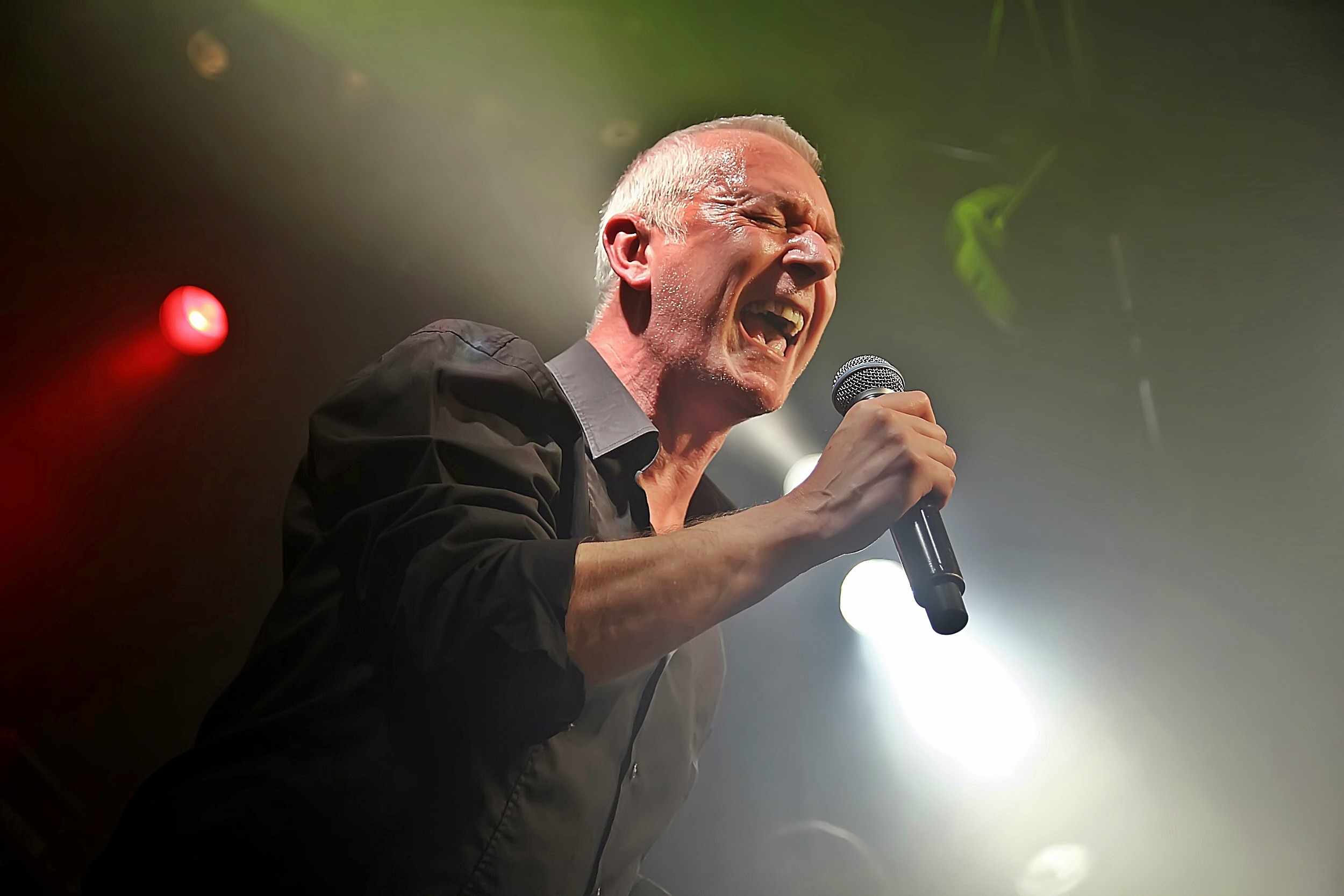
Danny Bowes with Thunder in 2019

After Thunder's breakup, Morley formed The Union with former Winterville frontman Peter Shoulder, while Childs also joined on bass. The band released their self-titled debut album in August 2010, which debuted at number 77 on the UK Albums Chart. Subsequent albums Siren's Song (2011) and The World Is Yours (2013) each charted in the UK top 100. Bowes and James featured on former Bad Company guitarist Dave "Bucket" Colwell's debut solo album Guitars, Beers & Tears (credited to "Bucket & Co.") – James performed drums on the whole album, while Bowes performed vocals on the song "Life". James also continued to record and tour with Magnum, who released the studio album The Visitation in 2011 which reached number 55 on the UK Albums Chart.

In February 2011, it was announced that Thunder would reunite for a performance at the High Voltage Festival on 24 July, although Bowes made it clear that "there's no plan to do any other recording going forwards", while Morley reiterated that it was a "one-off reunion". Following the festival, however, the band announced that they would perform another show on 21 December at Rock City in Nottingham, while Bowes and Matthews would also perform a short run of six "intimate sit down shows" the following February. A second show at Rock City was later added the day after the first. Both shows were documented on the live albums Rock City 12: The Baubles Are Back in Town and The Xmas Show 2011, released in 2012. Another pair of shows in December followed a year later, this time at the Manchester Academy, with the band committing to annual Christmas shows in the future. The band supported Journey and Whitesnake on tour in May 2013, as well as performing at a number of summer festivals.

In May 2014, Thunder announced that they were due to record their first studio album since 2008. A statement released by a spokesperson for the band stated that "after what has been a rather silly amount of knob-twiddling and string-pulling, I'm happy to report that they've decided to record a new studio album". Responding to the question over the band's "change of heart" regarding the possibility of new material, Bowes commented that they decided to record a new album after receiving an "overwhelming response" from fans when they supported Journey and Whitesnake the previous year. Sessions for the album took place at Rockfield Studios in Wales, with Morley producing the record. Much of the album was recorded without the involvement of Matthews, who was going through treatment for throat cancer at the time. Wonder Days was released in February 2015, and became the first Thunder album to reach the UK Albums Chart top ten since 1995's Behind Closed Doors, when it peaked at number 9. The album was voted the 11th best of 2015 by Classic Rock magazine, while the publication ranked the title track as the fifth best song of the year. Thunder were also named Best British Band at Planet Rock's end-of-year awards.

The band toured extensively in promotion of Wonder Days, including three UK arena shows in March alongside Reef and Tax the Heat, numerous festival appearances in the summer, a run of European shows in November (including one of the first in Paris, France following the November 2015 attacks), and five arena shows with Terrorvision and King King in February 2016.

Later in the year, the group released their first career-retrospective book Giving the Game Away: The Thunder Story, written by Joel McIver. The book was launched at the Louder Than Words Festival in Manchester on 12 November 2016, where the band performed a short acoustic set and spoke with McIver live.

The follow-up to Wonder Days was announced in December to be Rip It Up, which would be released the following February and supported by a UK tour starting in March. The album reached number 3 on the UK Albums Chart, marking the highest position achieved by the band since Laughing on Judgement Day reached number 2 in 1992. Thunder performed their first shows ever in Australia shortly after the album's release, before returning to Europe in April for a string of dates.

On 1 December 2017 the band released the single "Christmas Day", including a re-recorded version of "Love Walked In" and acoustic recordings of "Low Life in High Places" and "Heartbreak Hurricane".

In October 2018, the band announced a new album with UK tour dates scheduled for February. Please Remain Seated was released through new label BMG on 18 January 2019, with "twelve radically reworked re-recordings of songs from their 30 year career" and has been described as "a more quiet album, taking in influences from rock, blues, country, jazz and soul".

As of October 2022, the band's latest album is Dopamine, which contains sixteen songs and constitutes the group's first double-album. The first single goes by the title "The Western Sky". Music website Blabbermouth.net praised the song as featuring Thunder sounding "as immediate as ever" while also labeling "The Western Sky" as a "razor-sharp, riff-driven track". The related music video, which focuses on motorcycle touring among various isolated landscapes, made its YouTube debut on 17 February 2022.

=== 2022–present: Bowes' illness, temporary hiatus, solo projects ===
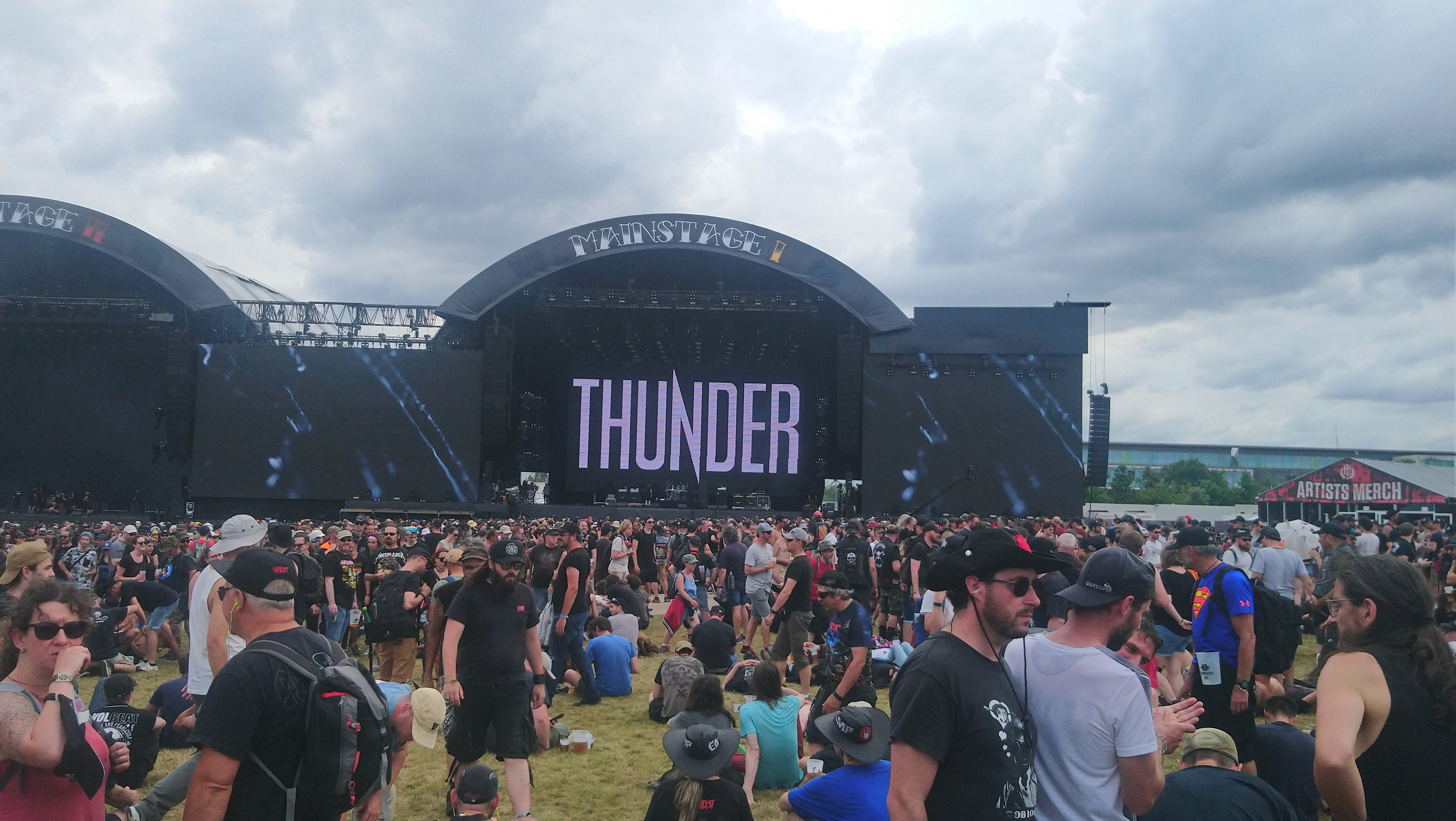
Thunder at Hellfest 2022

Luke Morley confirmed in an interview in November 2023 that Thunder were currently on a break, following Bowes' illness, and released a solo album, Songs from the Blue Room. He also confirmed that he had recorded an album and would tour with the Quireboys, led by singer Spike, who he had known since the 1980s.

Morley continued to tour and play with the Quireboys in 2024, as well as producing their album, Wardour Street, and also announcing in October that he had completed work on his third solo album. The album, entitled Walking on Water, was officially announced on 21 February 2025, coinciding with the release of a single of the same name.

The album was released on 1 August 2025 and Morley toured in September 2025 to support the album, his solo band also featuring Chris Childs on bass.

Bowes meanwhile undertook a spoken word tour in June 2025, but confirmed he remained unable to sing.

Chris Childs continued to tour with Tyketto, and in 2025 recorded an album which he co-produced with Danny Vaughan.

He also continued to play in the band Guitar Heads with Harry James.

== Band members ==
Current members

- Danny Bowes – lead vocals (1989–2000, 2002–2009, 2011–present)
- Luke Morley – guitar, keyboards, harmonica, mandolin, backing vocals (1989–2000, 2002–2009, 2011–present)
- Ben Matthews – guitar, keyboards, backing vocals (1989–2000, 2002–2009, 2011–present)
- Gary "Harry" James – drums, percussion, guitar, backing vocals (1989–2000, 2002–2009, 2011–present)
- Chris Childs – bass, backing vocals (1996–2000, 2002–2009, 2011–present)

Former members

- Mark "Snake" Luckhurst – bass, backing vocals (1989–1992)
- Mikael "Micke" Höglund – bass, backing vocals (1993–1996)

Timeline

== Discography ==
Studio albums

- Backstreet Symphony (1990)
- Laughing on Judgement Day (1992)
- Behind Closed Doors (1995)
- The Thrill of It All (1996)
- Giving the Game Away (1999)
- Shooting at the Sun (2003)
- The Magnificent Seventh! (2005)
- Robert Johnson's Tombstone (2006)
- Bang! (2008)
- Wonder Days (2015)
- Rip It Up (2017)
- Please Remain Seated (2019)
- All the Right Noises (2021)
- Dopamine (2022)

== Concert tours ==
- The Toilet Tour (1989)
- Static Discharge Tour (1989)
- Backstreet Symphony Tour (1990–1991)
- Drink Canada Dry Tour (1991)
- Laughing All Over the World Tour (1992–1993)
- Stand Up and Be Counted Tour (1994)
- Behind Closed Doors Tour (1995)
- Their Finest Set (And a Bit) Tour (1995)
- The Thrill of It All Tour (1997)
- The Live Tour (1998)
- Giving the Game Away Tour (1999)
- The Farewell Tour (1999–2000)
- Monsters of Rock Arena Tour (2002)
- Shooting at the Sun Tour (2003–2004)
- The Magnificent Seventh Tour (2005–2006)
- Robert Johnson's Tombstone Tour (2006–2007)
- Six of One... Tour (2007)
- Bang! Tour (2008)
- 20 Years & Out: The Farewell Tour (2009)
- Wonder Days Tour (2015–2016)
- Rip It Up Tour (2017)
- Please Remain Seated Tour (2019)
- Dopamine Tour (2022)

== Bibliography ==
- McIver, Joel (11 November 2016), Giving the Game Away: The Thunder Story, London, England: Omnibus Press, ISBN 978-1785581373
