= Luke Morley =

British musician (born 1960)

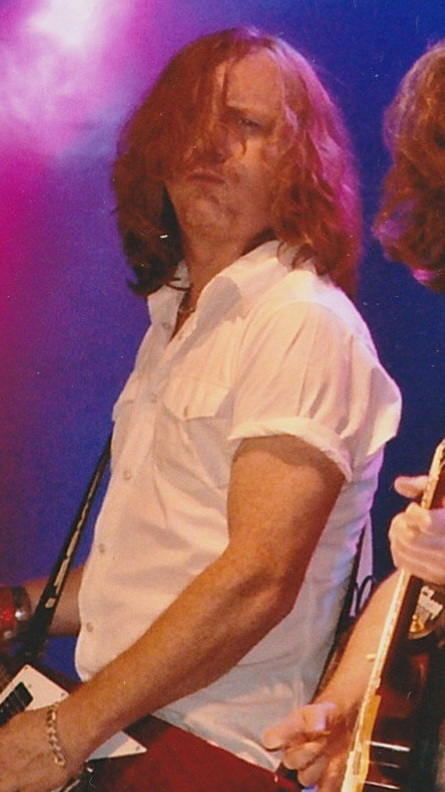
- Morley with Thunder in 2005

Background information
- Born: 19 June 1960 (age 66)
- Origin: London, England
- Genre: Rock
- Occupations: Singer; guitarist; songwriter; producer
- Instruments: Guitar; vocals
- Years active: 1985–present
- Label: Various
- Member of: Thunder; The Quireboys
- Formerly of: Terraplane
- Website: lukemorleyonline.com

Luke Morley (born 19 June 1960) is the guitarist, chief songwriter and producer for the hard rock band Thunder from 1989 to present (with a break from 1999–2002, and 2009–2011). Previous to that he was a member of 1980s group, Terraplane who subsequently became Thunder.

Since 2023, he has also been the guitarist and producer for fellow 90s rockers the Quireboys.

== Early life ==
Luke was born on the 19th of June 1960 in Camberwell, London, and attended Haberdasher Aske's Hatcham College. There he met Danny Bowes for the first time, in September 1971. They became friends three years later and formed the band Nuthin' Fancy, and spent four years touring in South London before forming Terraplane.

== Terraplane ==
After Nuthin' Fancy, Morley and Bowes went on to form the band Terraplane. They appeared at the Reading Festival in 1982 and released two albums before breaking up in 1988. Both Morley and Bowes decided they wanted to pursue a hard rock sound.

== Thunder ==
Morley formed Thunder in 1989 with Bowes and Harry James from Terraplane and were joined by Ben Matthews. They signed a record deal with EMI in 1989.

== The Union ==
In 2009, when Thunder announced that they were splitting up, Morley became the lead guitarist and co-songwriter for the rock band the Union, which he formed with guitarist and co-songwriter, Peter Shoulder. They released three albums before Thunder reformed in 2011.

== Return to Thunder ==
Thunder reformed in 2011 following a two-year hiatus, and has since released another five albums.

== Solo career ==
Morley released his first solo album, El Gringo Retro, in 2001. Tales from the Blue Room, which was recorded during the COVID-19 lockdowns, followed in 2023. Morley played all of the instruments except drums on the album, and is due to tour in January 2024 to promote the album.

Morley confirmed in a Facebook post in October 2024 that he is working on his third solo album.

The first single from the new album was released on the 21 February 2025, titled Walking on Water, with the album of the same name to be released later in the year together with a tour to promote the same.

== The Quireboys ==
In November 2023 it was announced that Morley had recorded an album with the Quireboys, and would tour in 2024 to promote the album.

Spike confirmed in a facebook post in June 2026 that Luke and himself were working on the next Quireboys album, with the first single due out in October ahead of the tour in November.

== Personal life ==
Morley is married to Tara, who works in the film industry, and they do not have children.

== Equipment ==
=== Guitars ===
Morley regularly plays the following guitars:

- Black Les Paul Traditional
- White Les Paul Custom (studio + live)
- White Fender Telecaster (studio + live)
- Burgundy Fender Stratocaster (studio)
- Ovation Balladeer acoustic (studio)
- Takamine Acoustic (studio + live)
- Gibson Flying V (live)

Other guitars in his collection include the Gibson EDS-1275.

=== Amps ===
- Marshall Vintage Modern

=== Harmonicas ===
- Hohner Blues or Cross Harp

== Discography ==
=== with Terraplane ===
- Black and White (1985)
- Moving Target (1987)

=== with Thunder ===
- Backstreet Symphony (1990)
- Laughing on Judgement Day (1992)
- Behind Closed Doors (1995)
- The Thrill of It All (1997)
- Giving the Game Away (1999)
- Shooting at the Sun (2002)
- The Magnificent Seventh (2005)
- Robert Johnson's Tombstone (2006)
- Bang! (2008)
- Wonder Days (2015)
- Rip It Up (2017)
- Please Remain Seated (2019)
- All the Right Noises (2021)
- Dopamine (2022)

=== with the Quireboys ===
- Wardour Street (2024)

=== Solo ===
- El Gringo Retro (2001)
- Songs from the Blue Room (2023)
- Walking on Water (2025)

=== Bowes & Morley ===
- Moving Swiftly Along (2002)
- Mo's Barbeque (2004)

=== The Union ===
- The Union (2010)
- Siren's Song (2011)
- The World Is Yours (2013)

=== Other appearances ===
- The Spanish Sessions EP (with Andy Taylor; 1999)
