= Chris Childs (bassist) =

English bass player

Christopher James Childs (born 24 June 1959) is an English bass player who is a member of the hard rock band Thunder since 1996.

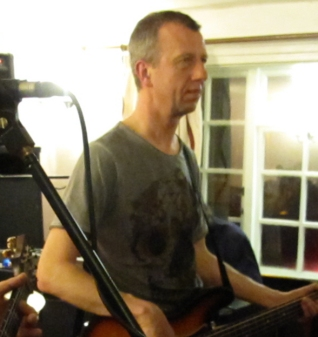
Chris Childs 2010

Born in the Essex village of Writtle, Chris Childs joined Thunder in November 1996, replacing Mikael Höglund, and has previously played with artists such as Paul Young, Andy Summers, Colin Blunstone, Then Jerico, Waterfront, Never The Bride and Go West. He also played bass with Russ Ballard, The Don Airey Band, toured with Luke Morley and Peter Shoulder's band The Union, Eagles tribute act The Ultimate Eagles, and as of 2025, is a member of Tyketto. As of 2026 bass player for Cats in Space.
