= Joel McIver =

British author (born 1971)

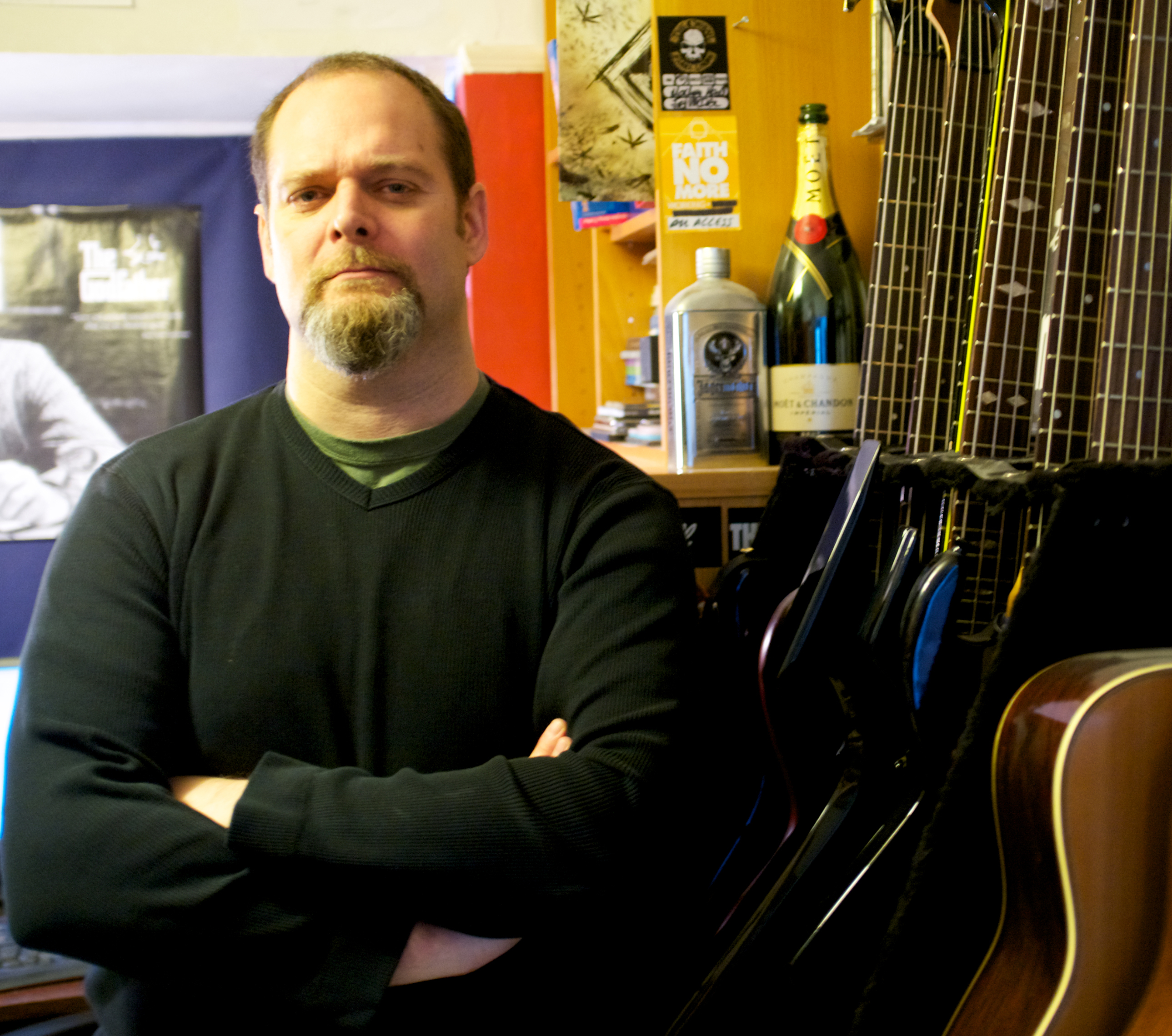
- McIver in 2013
- Born: 10 February 1971 (age 55)
- Education: University of Edinburgh
- Occupation: Author
- Writing career
- Genre: Biography
- Subject: Non-fiction
- Notable work: Justice for All: The Truth About Metallica

Joel McIver (born 10 February 1971) is a British author. His best-known work is Justice for All: The Truth About Metallica, first published in 2004 and appearing in nine languages since then. McIver's other works include biographies of Black Sabbath, Slayer, Thunder, Ice Cube, and Queens of the Stone Age. His writing appears in newspapers and magazines such as The Guardian, the Daily Telegraph and Classic Rock, and he is an occasional guest on BBC and commercial radio and television.

== Education and career ==
McIver is an alumnus of Backwell School and the University of Edinburgh.

McIver was the editor of Bass Player magazine from 2018 to 2022, having spent six years before that editing Bass Guitar magazine.

== Works ==
Since 1999, McIver has written 36 books. In the introduction to Neil Daniels' 2009 book All Pens Blazing, writer Martin Popoff described McIver as "probably the top [rock] scribe in the world". In a review in April 2012, Classic Rock magazine described him as "...by some distance, Britain's most prolific hard rock/metal author..."

As well as writing his own books, McIver has co-written several musicians' autobiographies. The first of these was the memoir of sometime Deep Purple bassist Glenn Hughes, published in 2011. Other memoirs co-written by McIver include those of Max Cavalera of Soulfly, Megadeth bassist David Ellefson, David Bowie's former drummer Woody Woodmansey and blues veteran John Mayall.

== Awards ==
As editor of Bass Guitar magazine, McIver received the 2018 Award of Excellence for Best Educational Project from the Players School of Music in Clearwater, Florida.

The same year, Sony's 35th-anniversary-edition reissue of The Alan Parsons Project's 1982 album Eye in the Sky, for which McIver wrote extensive liner notes, won its category at the annual Prog magazine awards. Parsons, along with surround mastering engineers Dave Donnelly and P. J. Olsson, won the Grammy Award for Best Immersive Audio Album for the box set at the 61st Annual Grammy Awards.

In 2018, McIver co-hosted a podcast called Dead Rock Stars with fellow writer Mick Wall. In June that year, The Guardian named Dead Rock Stars their podcast of the week.

In 2024, an extinct species of brittle star was named ophiolofsson joelmciveri by Dr Mats Eriksson of the University of Lund, Sweden.

== Bibliography ==
=== As writer ===
- Extreme Metal (foreword by Jeffrey Dunn of Venom, 2000)
- Slipknot: Unmasked (2001)
- Nu-Metal: The Next Generation of Rock and Punk (foreword by Casey Chaos of Amen, 2002)
- Ice Cube: Attitude (2002)
- Erykah Badu: The First Lady of Neo-Soul (2003)
- Justice for All: The Truth About Metallica (foreword by Thomas Gabriel Fischer of Celtic Frost and Triptykon, 2004)
- Extreme Metal II (foreword by Mille Petrozza of Kreator, 2005)
- No One Knows: The Queens of the Stone Age Story (foreword by Kat Bjelland of Babes In Toyland, 2005)
- The Making of the Red Hot Chili Peppers' Blood Sugar Sex Magik (2005)
- The Making of the Sex Pistols' The Great Rock'n'Roll Swindle (2006)
- Sabbath Bloody Sabbath (2006)
- The Bloody Reign of Slayer (foreword by the members of Municipal Waste, 2008)
- The 100 Greatest Metal Guitarists (foreword by Glen Benton of Deicide, 2009)
- Unleashed: The Story of Tool (2009)
- To Live Is to Die: The Life and Death of Metallica's Cliff Burton (foreword by Kirk Hammett of Metallica, 2009; updated with afterword by Frank Bello of Anthrax, 2016)
- Holy Rock'N'Rollers: The Kings of Leon Story (2010)
- Crazy Train: The High Life and Tragic Death of Randy Rhoads (foreword by Zakk Wylde of Black Label Society, afterword by Yngwie Malmsteen, 2011)
- Overkill: The Untold Story of Motörhead (foreword by Glenn Hughes, 2011)
- Machine Head: Inside the Machine (foreword by Chris Kontos, formerly of Machine Head, 2012)
- Ultimate Rock Riffs (foreword by Robb Flynn of Machine Head, 2013)
- Know Your Enemy: Rage Against the Machine (2014)
- Sinister Urge: The Life and Times of Rob Zombie (foreword by Jeremy Wagner of Broken Hope, 2015)
- The Complete History of Black Sabbath: What Evil Lurks (foreword by Robb Flynn of Machine Head, 2016)

=== As official biographer or co-writer ===
- Deep Purple and Beyond: Scenes from the Life of a Rock Star (with Glenn Hughes, foreword by Lars Ulrich of Metallica, 2011)
- My Life with Deth: Discovering Meaning in a Life of Rock & Roll (with David Ellefson, foreword by Alice Cooper, 2013)
- My Bloody Roots: From Sepultura to Soulfly and Beyond (with Max Cavalera, foreword by Dave Grohl, 2013, revised in 2022 with afterword by Randy Blythe)
- Glen Matlock's Sex Pistols Filthy Lucre Photo File (with Glen Matlock, foreword by Chad Smith of the Red Hot Chili Peppers, 2014)
- Bible of Butchery: Cannibal Corpse, The Official Biography (foreword by Gene Hoglan, 2014)
- Thunder: Giving the Game Away: The Official Biography (foreword by Andy Taylor, formerly of Duran Duran, 2016)
- Spider from Mars: My Life with David Bowie (with Woody Woodmansey, foreword by Tony Visconti, afterword by Joe Elliott of Def Leppard, 2016)
- Blues from Laurel Canyon: My Life as a Bluesman (with John Mayall, foreword by Mick Fleetwood of Fleetwood Mac, 2019)
- I Am Morbid: Ten Lessons Learned from Extreme Metal, Outlaw Country, and the Power of Self-Determination (with David Vincent, foreword by astrophysicist Matt Taylor, 2020)
- The Saga of Skálmöld (foreword by President of Iceland Guðni Th. Jóhannesson, 2021)
- Fathers, Brothers, and Sons: Surviving Anguish, Abandonment, and Anthrax (with Frank Bello, foreword by Gene Simmons of Kiss, 2021)
- Still Too Sexy: Surviving Right Said Fred (with Richard Fairbrass and Fred Fairbrass, foreword by Eddie Kidd, 2022)
- The Alan Parsons Project (foreword by Clive Davis, 2026)

=== Forewords and introductions ===
- Only Death Is Real: An Illustrated History of Hellhammer and Early Celtic Frost 1981–1985 by Tom Gabriel Fischer (2010)
- Only the Good Die Young by Jason Draper (2012)
- A Peaceville Life by Paul "Hammy" Halmshaw (2016)
- More Life with Deth by David Ellefson (2019)
