= Harry James (drummer) =

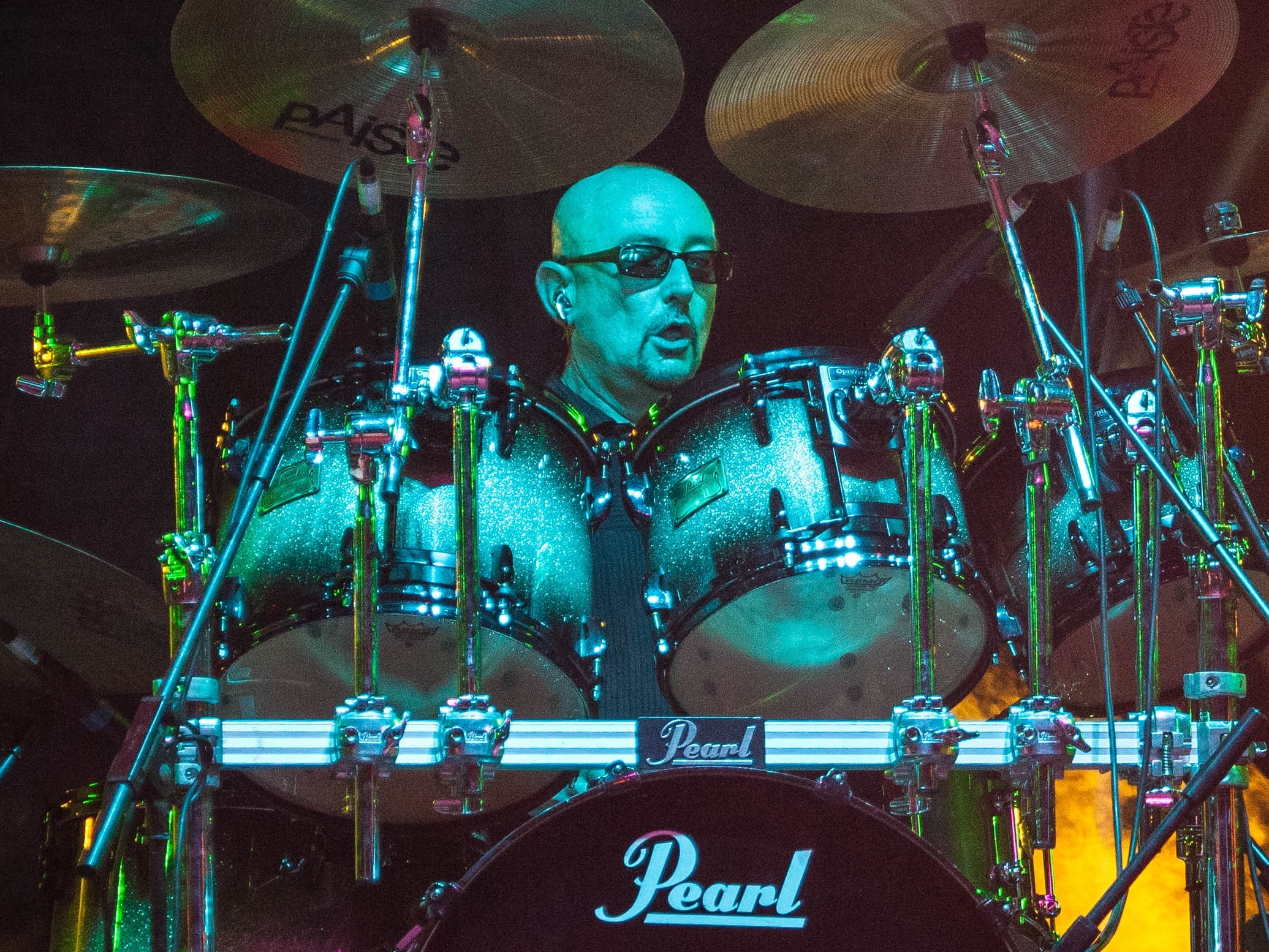
- James performing with Cregan & Co in 2014.

Background information
- Born: Gary Harry James; 14 December 1960 (age 65); Beckenham, Kent, England
- Genre: Hard rock
- Occupation: Drummer
- Years active: 1980s–present
- Member of: Thunder
- Formerly of: Magnum; Terraplane
- Website: www.harryjames.info

Gary Harry James (born 14 December 1960) is an English drummer best known for his work with hard rock bands Thunder and Magnum.

James began playing drums at age eight, following in the footsteps of his father. He played his first gig in his early teens. Popular with rock fans as much for his cheerful persona as for his powerhouse drumming, he was previously a member of 1980s group Terraplane, along with future Thunder members Luke Morley and Danny Bowes.

He also plays drums with Snakecharmer, Cregan & Co and London blues-rock act Bad Influence. He has performed live on stage with The Ian Gillan Band, Graham Bonnet, Don Airey, Mick Ralphs, Paul Young and made a guest appearance playing drums for UK the prog rock band Breathing Space.

In the studio, as well as his extensive back catalogue with Thunder and Magnum, Harry has contributed to work by Don Airey, Russ Ballard, Shadowman (featuring FM's vocalist Steve Overland, Heartland's Steve Morris and Thunder's Chris Childs), Kate Aumonier, Carl Sentance, Bucket & Co and Hellfire Corner.

James is backed by Pearl, Paiste, Pro-Mark and Protection Racket.
