= Danny Bowes =

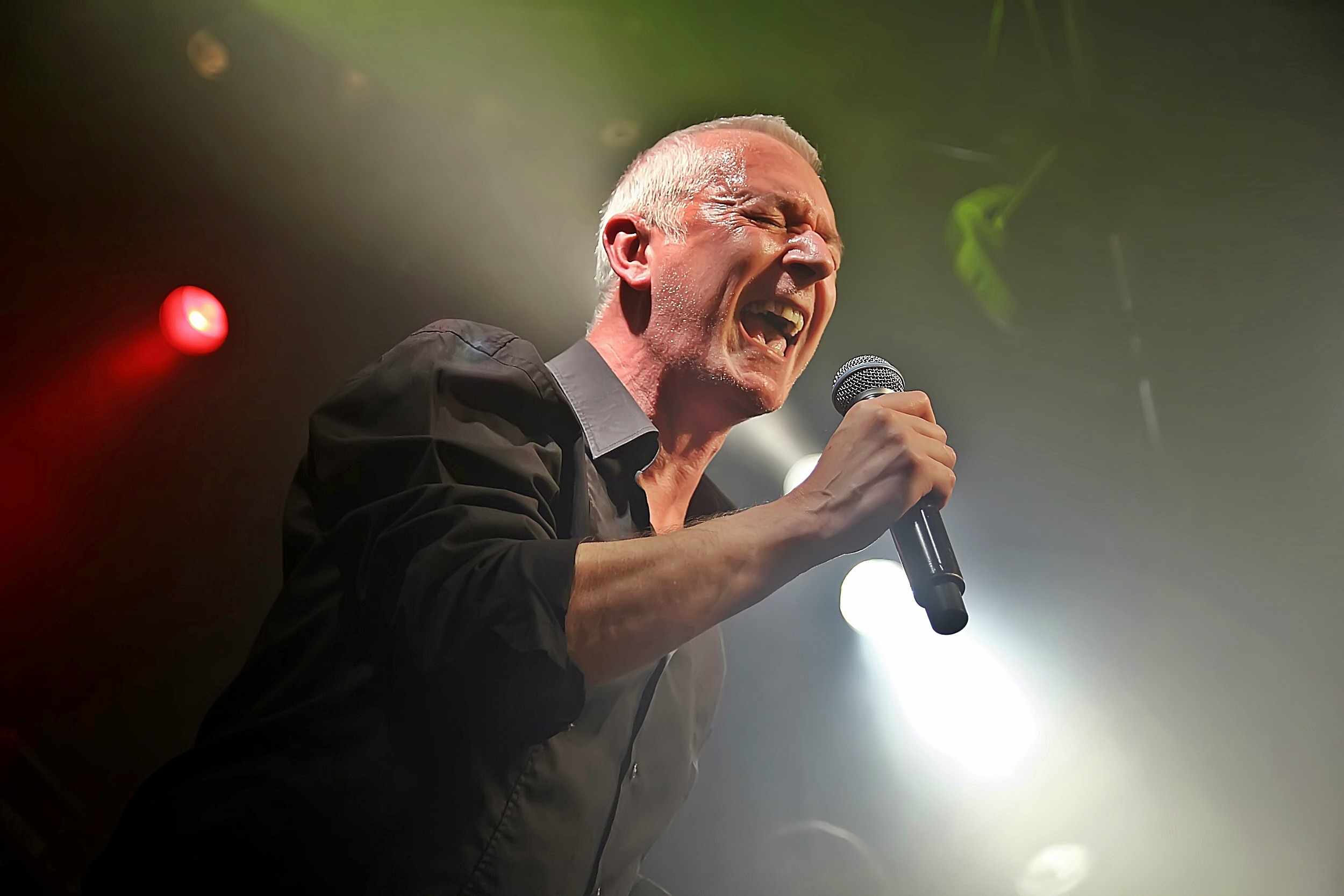

Background information
- Born: 14 April 1960 (age 66); West Ham, Essex, England
- Genre: Hard rock
- Instrument: Vocals
- Years active: 1979–present
- Member of: Thunder
- Formerly of: Terraplane

Daniel John Bowes (born 14 April 1960) is a British singer, best known as the lead vocalist of the hard rock band Thunder.

== Education ==
Bowes was educated at Haberdashers' Aske's Hatcham College.

== Life and career ==
Bowes is the lead singer with the rock act Thunder. Previously, he was a member of Nuthin' Fancy and 1980s group Terraplane, both with Thunder guitarist Luke Morley with whom he also recorded as duet 'Bowes & Morley'.

Bowes took to the road with another Thunder bandmate Ben Matthews for several concerts titled "An Evening With Danny & Ben From Thunder" in early 2012 and has contributed vocals to an album by Dean Howard who was previously with T'Pau. He also currently hosts a show on Planet Rock.

In August 2022, Bowes sustained an accidental head injury that required surgery. He announced that while he remained unable to sing due to his illness, he would undertake a spoken word tour in June 2025.
