= Ben Matthews (musician) =

British musician (born 1963)

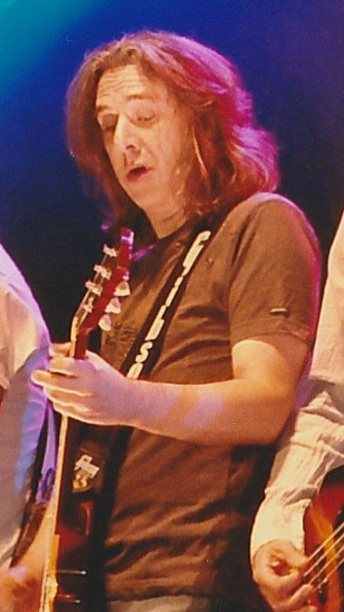
Matthews in 2005

Ben Matthews (born 21 July 1963) is the guitarist and keyboard player with the hard rock band Thunder. He is also an experienced studio engineer and mixer; he worked with progressive rock act Mostly Autumn as studio engineer on their 2005 album Storms Over Still Water. He also guested on their 2006 live album Storms Over London Town. He uses mainly Gibson and Fender guitars with Marshall amplification.

== Equipment ==
=== Guitars ===
Matthews uses the following unmodified guitars

- Gibson Les Paul Custom
- Gibson Les Paul Gold Top
- Gibson Les Paul Custom Shop Reissue
- Fender Telecaster
