= St Wilfrid's Church, Alford =

Coordinates: 53°15′42″N 0°10′50″E

St. Wilfrid's Church, Alford
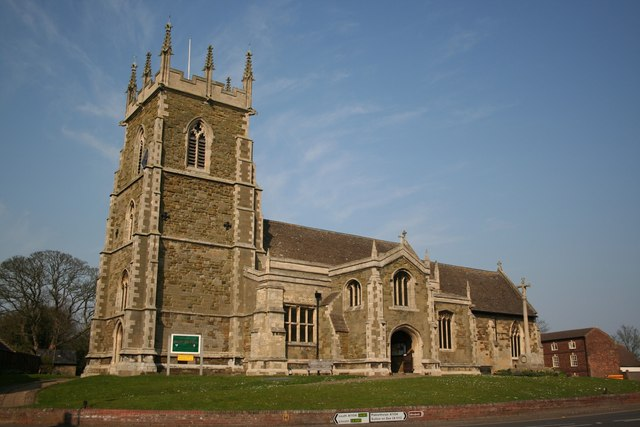
- St. Wilfrid's Church, Alford
- St. Wilfrid's Church, Alford
- Denomination: Church of England
- Churchmanship: Broad Church
- Website: St Wilfrid's Church, Alford

History
- Dedication: St. Wilfrid

Administration
- Province: Canterbury
- Diocese: Lincoln
- Parish: Alford, Lincolnshire

Clergy
- Vicar: Rev Ros Latham

St Wilfrid's, Alford is the Church of England parish church in Alford, Lincolnshire, England. It is a Grade I listed building.

== Background ==
The church is named after the English bishop and saint St Wilfrid, and is the second church to be built on the site, the earlier having been constructed of wood. The church was thought to have been built in 1350; but in the early 21st century, one corner of the building was found to date back to 1289. The tower was rebuilt between 1525 and 1535, and Sir Gilbert Scott led an extensive restoration of the building in 1867.

Included within the church are a 14th-century rood screen dividing the chancel from the nave, a Jacobean pulpit, traces of 16th-century glass within the stained glass windows, and a 17th-century tomb within the chancel.

== Bells ==
St Wilfrid's has a peal of six bells, originally cast and hung for full circle bellringing by John Taylors & Co of Loughborough in 1934.

The first peal of 5,040 changes was rung in June 1935; since then there have been a further 38 peals. Bell ringers are drawn from a wide age range and work under the tutelage of a teacher. Since 1991 there have been 16 peals rung on the bells.

== Bell ringing achievements ==
In 2008 six St Wilfrid's bell ringers entered the local striking competition and were placed second, allowing them to enter the lower level of the county competition in which they were runners-up. In 2009 the St Wilfrid's team competed and won the local striking competition held at SS Mary & Nicholas, Wrangle; they entered the higher level of the county competitions in September 2009. On 4 June 2011 the St Wilfrid's team competed and won the local six bell striking competition at Friskney. They entered the higher level of the county competitions in September 2011.

== Churches within the Alford Group of Parishes ==
- St Wilfrid's Church, Alford
- St Andrew's Church, Beesby
- Holy Trinity Church, Bilsby
- St Andrew's Church, Farlesthorpe
- St Andrew's Church, Hannah cum Hagnaby
- St Peter's Church, Markby
- St James' Church, Rigsby
- St Margaret's Church, Saleby
- All Saints' Church, Ulceby, East Lindsey
- St Margaret's Church, Well
- St Helena's Church, Willoughby, Lincolnshire

== Weekly or regular activities held within the Alford Group of Parishes ==
- Beavers (Children / Teenagers)
- Bell Ringing (All Ages)
- Boys' Brigade (Children / Teenagers)
- Brownies (Children / Teenagers)
- Cubs (Children / Teenagers)
- Football Club (Children / Teenagers)
- Girls' Brigade (Children / Teenagers)
- Guides (Children / Teenagers)
- Mother and Toddler Club (Mothers and Toddlers)
- Model Aircraft Club (Children / Teenagers
- Rainbows (Children / Teenagers)
- Scouts (Children / Teenagers)
- Sunday Bunch (Children / Teenagers)
- Young Farmers (Children / Teenagers)
- YP's (Children / Teenagers)

== External sources ==
- Alford Group Of Parishes
