= Aby, Lincolnshire =

Village in Lincolnshire, England

Coordinates: 53.283044°N 0.118016°E

Aby
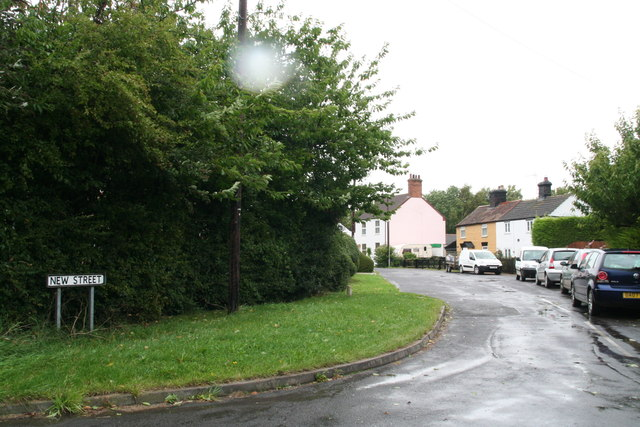
- New Street on a rainy day

- Location within Lincolnshire
- OS grid reference: TF413783
  - London: 120 mi (190 km) S
- Civil parish: Aby with Greenfield
- District: East Lindsey
- Shire county: Lincolnshire
- Ceremonial county: Lincolnshire
- Region: East Midlands
- Country: England
- Sovereign state: United Kingdom
- Post town: Alford
- Postcode district: LN13
- Police: Lincolnshire
- Fire: Lincolnshire
- Ambulance: East Midlands
- UK Parliament: Louth and Horncastle (UK Parliament constituency)

Aby (/ˈeɪbiː/ AY-bee) is a village in the East Lindsey district of Lincolnshire, England. It is approximately 30 miles (48 km) east from the city and county town of Lincoln and 8 miles (13 km) south-east from Louth. Aby is part of the civil parish of Aby with Greenfield.

== History ==
The village's name is of Old Norse origin, and means "village on a river" (Old Norse á, river, and býr, village). The villages of Åby in Sweden and Aaby in Denmark have names of identical origin and meaning. The Great Eau flows through the village.

Aby was mentioned in the Domesday Book. Its lands were owned by Odo who was Bishop of Bayeux and half-brother of William the Conqueror, and Earl Hugh. It had available 27 acres of woodland for the feeding of swine. Swinn Wood still exists today and is a nature reserve.

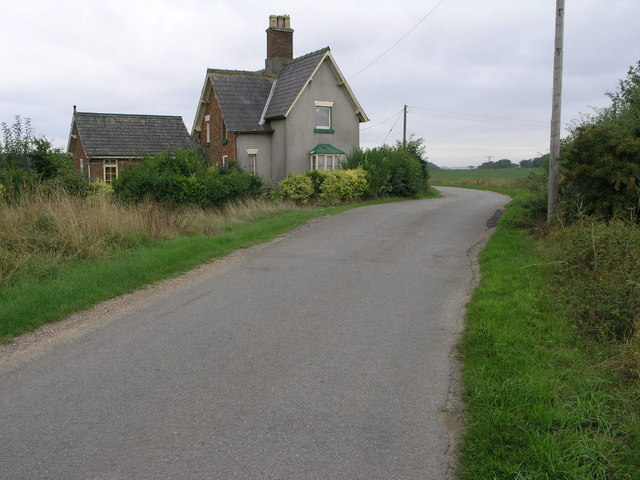
Old Gatehouse

Aby's 13th-century All Saints Church fell into disrepair and was demolished by Sir Henry Vane in 1660. The stone was removed to Belleau for use on the Manor House. In 1888 a pitch pine chapel was erected on the original site, but all that remains today is the churchyard.

Aby railway station opened in neighbouring Claythorpe in 1848, and closed in 1961. Before the railway line was closed, the village had the distinction of the shortest signal box name on the British network.

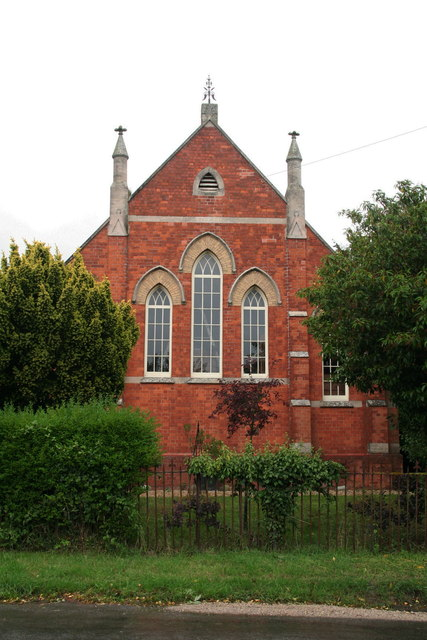
Former Methodist Chapel

The Wesleyan Methodists built a red brick chapel in Aby in 1895. It later closed and is now a private residence.

Aby's public house is The Railway Tavern.

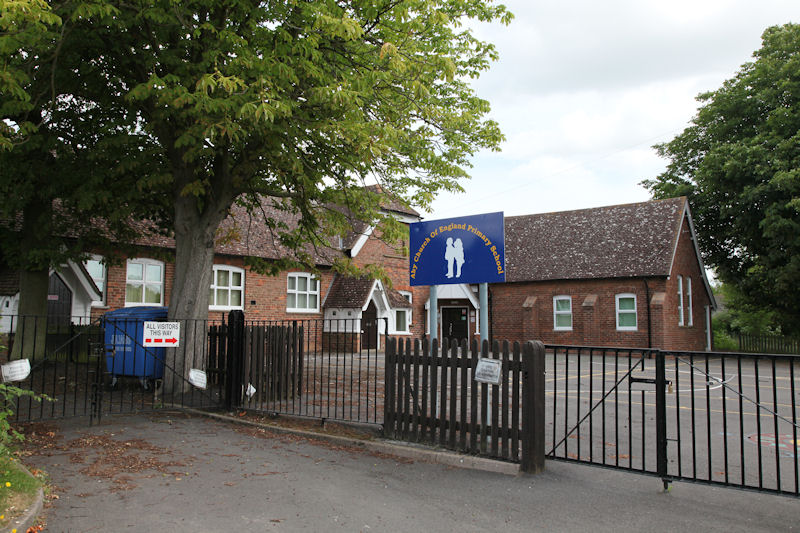
Primary School

There are no schools in the village; the Aby CofE Primary School, which opened in 1852 was closed in 2009. There are schools in nearby Withern, Alford and Willoughby.

== Landmarks ==
Five miles south of Aby in Alford, there is the Alford Manor House Museum. The Claythorpe Watermill and Wildfowl Gardens are in Claythorpe, less than a mile away. Church Farm Museum is located in nearby Skegness. Bolingbroke Castle is also nearby in Old Bolingbroke.
