= Maltby le Marsh =

Village and civil parish in the East Lindsey district of Lincolnshire, England

Coordinates: 53.310275°N 0.200245°E

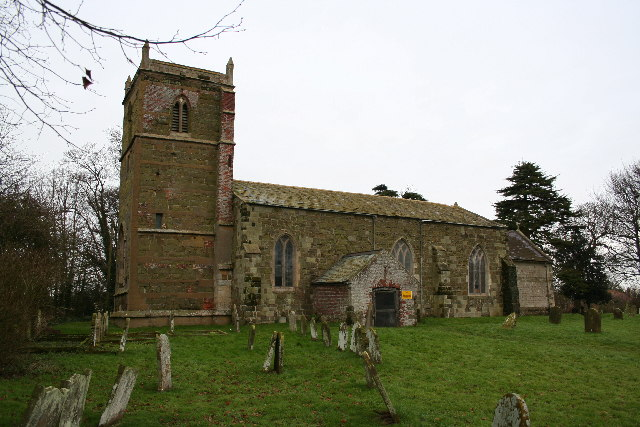
- All Saints' Church, Maltby le Marsh

- Location within Lincolnshire
- Population: 342 (2011)
- OS grid reference: TF466815
  - London: 125 mi (201 km) S
- District: East Lindsey
- Shire county: Lincolnshire
- Region: East Midlands
- Country: England
- Sovereign state: United Kingdom
- Post town: Alford
- Postcode district: LN13
- Police: Lincolnshire
- Fire: Lincolnshire
- Ambulance: East Midlands
- UK Parliament: Louth and Horncastle

Maltby le Marsh is a village and civil parish in the East Lindsey district of Lincolnshire, England. The village is situated between Alford and Mablethorpe, and at the junction of the A1104 and A157 roads.

Maltby le Marsh contains a shop, newsagent, post office, and service station, the Crown Inn and Turks Head public houses, and Oham (fishing) Lake. All of these facilities have since closed, bar the fishing lakes

Maltby le Marsh tower mill is disused, with sails removed, but the brick base survives. All trace of a previous post mill has disappeared.

Previously there existed a 12th-century Anglican church dedicated to All Saints, a Baptist chapel and a Methodist chapel. The Anglican church is disused – the village shares the church at Beesby. The Baptist chapel has been converted to a house, and the Methodist to the village hall, which is shared with Strubby and Beesby.

The rectory to All Saints' Church was built in 1839. The first incumbent was the Reverend Robert Allott who was responsible for building a Church school in 1847. When it closed in 1922, it had 72 pupils. The rectory was sold in 1938 and by 1990 was a private nursing home.
