= John Spendluffe Technology College =

Location
- Alford, Lincolnshire, LN13 9BL; England
- Coordinates: 53°15′28″N 0°10′59″E

Information
- Type: Academy
- Motto: Aspirational, Inspirational, Motivated
- Established: 1 August 2011
- Specialist: Technology
- Department for Education URN: 136968 Tables
- Ofsted: Reports
- Chair of Governors: G. Willoughby
- Head teacher: Simon Curtis
- Staff: 44 teaching 21 administrative
- Gender: Mixed
- Age: 11 to 16
- Enrolment: 612
- Houses: red, green and blue
- Colour
- Website: http://www.john-spendluffe.lincs.sch.uk/college.htm

John Spendluffe Technology College (JSTC) is a secondary school with academy status situated on Hanby Lane in the rural market town of Alford, Lincolnshire, England. It does not have a sixth form.

== History ==
It was formed in 1932, the first under the Hadow scheme, in Lindsey. Broadcaster Olive Shapley presented 'The Changing School' on 22 May 1938 on BBC Radio.

The school was named after John Spendluffe of Farlesthorpe, who died in 1558, who also funded two fellowships at Magdalene College, Cambridge. The school was named John Spendluffe by 1974. The school has had a swimming pool.

In the late 1960s there plans for comprehensive schools. With the Tennyson School in Mablethorpe, it would become a three-form entry middle school. The Queen Elizabeth Alford school would be the comprehensive secondary school.

In July 1986 the Joint Education Action Group was formed to promote comprehensive education, and organise petitions, in the Alford and Mablethorpe area, with chairman Richard Quantrell. Later in 1986, Lincolnshire County Council planned to close the school, to be educated in Mablethorpe or Louth instead.

The school was to close in July 1989, with no more admissions from September 1988. School governors protested against the proposals. The plans were ultimately rejected in April 1988.

In the mid-1990s there were 300 at the school, with around 20 in each class.

=== Facilities ===
In May 1993 the East Lindsey council found £75,000 for a new sports hall. Charity sports events took place to raise money for the new sports hall. Construction was hoped to start in November 1994; it started in January 1995. The sports hall opened in January 1996.

The Duke of Gloucester officially opened the new £616,000 sports hall on Thursday 27 June 1996, which had opened in January 1996, and later opened the new £2.1m Louth police station.

=== Headteachers ===
- 1970s, Mr Trevor Evans
- October 1979 Mrs A Pinion, she left as the school was facing closure
- September 1988 Grant Allan, until July 1999; in the 1980s he had been county president of the NASUWT, and had taught craft design and technology from 1982; he was a district councillor on East Lindsey council from 1971
- 1999 48 year old Paul Kitson, his wife taught at a secondary modern in Bourne; he had been a deputy head of a secondary modern school in Grantham, that had been facing possible closure in 1995, so he had to sack half of the teachers

== Admissions ==
The current Headteacher is Mr Simon Curtis, who joined the school in September 2021 taking over from Ms Joyce Shorrock who retired in August 2021. There are 55 staff and 13 support staff. Currently there are 612 students on role, However it does not have a Sixth form.

It is a popular alternative for pupils living in the Alford area if they do not wish to attend or were not accepted into Queen Elizabeth's Grammar School, Alford

== Academy and specialism ==
In February 2003 the school was designated as a Technology College. Although the specialist schools programme has now ended the school still retains its Technology College status.

In 2005 the school was identified by the government as a foundation school, and in August 2011 the school converted to academy status.

== Academic performance ==
Although the school has received In 2019, JSTC students achieved improved results over the previous academic year in key subjects,;50% had a standard pass in mathematics, while 56% had a standard pass in English. In 2022, the school received an Ofsted rating of "Good".

== Departments ==
English Department

Humanities Department

- Geography
- History
- R.E.

ICT Department

Mathematics Department

Modern Foreign Languages Department

- Spanish

Expressive Arts

- Art
- Drama
- Music

P.E. Department

SEN Department

Science Department

Technology

- Product Design
- Food
- Textiles
- Child Development

This is from the jets website

== Other schools in Alford ==
- Alford Primary School
- Queen Elizabeth's Grammar School, Alford

== Alumni ==
- Joby Gowshall, briefly a Grimsby footballer in 1996
