= Belleau, Lincolnshire =

Hamlet and civil parish in the East Lindsey district of Lincolnshire, England

Coordinates: 53.285948°N 0.101837°E

Belleau
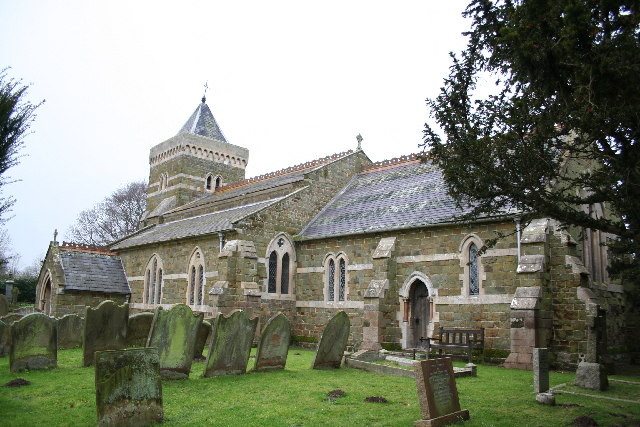
- Church of St John the Baptist, Belleau

- Location within Lincolnshire
- OS grid reference: TF402786
  - London: 120 mi (190 km) S
- District: East Lindsey
- Shire county: Lincolnshire
- Region: East Midlands
- Country: England
- Sovereign state: United Kingdom
- Post town: Alford
- Postcode district: LN13
- Police: Lincolnshire
- Fire: Lincolnshire
- Ambulance: East Midlands
- UK Parliament: Louth and Horncastle

Belleau is a hamlet and civil parish in the East Lindsey district of Lincolnshire, England. It is situated approximately 7 miles (11 km) south-east of Louth, and 4 miles (6 km) north-west of Alford. The parish of Belleau includes the hamlet of Claythorpe.

According to the census of 2001, the population of Belleau in that year was eighteen, living in eight households. At the time of the 2011 census, the population remained fewer than 100 and was included in the civil parish of Authorpe.

The name of the village is taken from the spring of the rivulet Eau which rises there.

The Grade II listed parish church of Belleau is dedicated to St John the Baptist. The church was almost entirely rebuilt in 1862. Near the church are the remains of an old manor house, the former home of the Earls of Lindsey. Other Bellau listed buildings are a pigeoncote and barn at Manor Farm.

A notable Belleau resident was the Puritan leader Henry Vane the Younger. Vane bought the Belleau estate after his marriage to Frances, the daughter of Sir Christopher Wray. Roger Williams, the founder of the American state of Rhode Island, dedicated one of his books to Frances after he came to stay at Belleau; he shared an interest in religious liberty with Vane. Vane employed the radical clergyman John Wheelwright as a chaplain.

England international footballer Beaumont Jarrett was Rector of Belleau from 1895 to his death in 1905.
