= Beesby with Saleby =

Civil parish in the East Lindsey district of Lincolnshire, England

Coordinates: 53.29°N 0.19°E

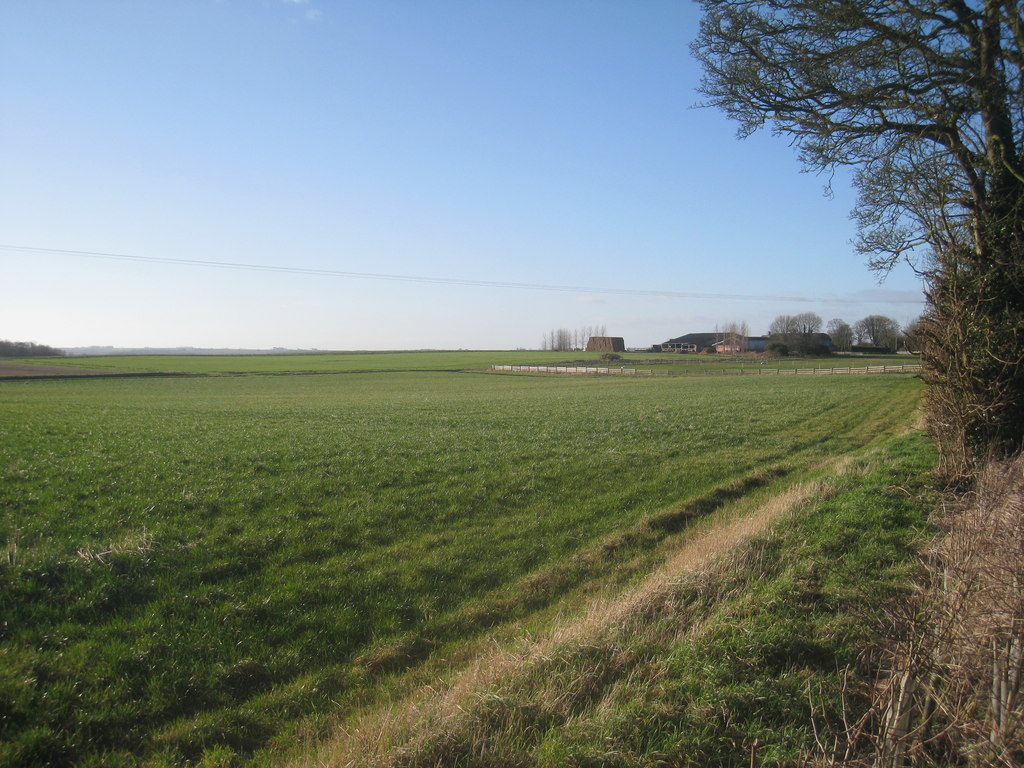
View toward Beesby Grange

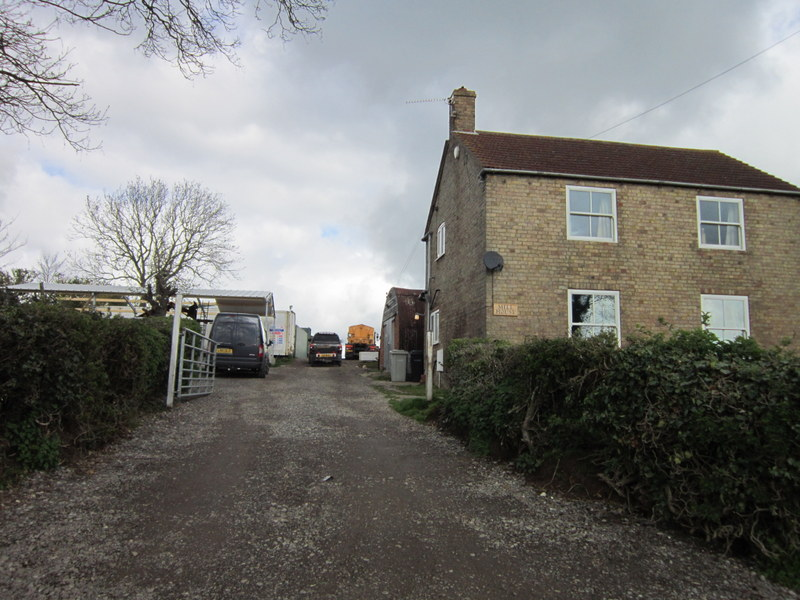
Mill House Farm near Saleby

Beesby with Saleby is a civil parish in the East Lindsey district of Lincolnshire, England. It includes Beesby and Saleby. According to the 2001 Census it had a population of 228, increasing to 258 at the 2011 Census.

The main A1104 road from Alford to Louth passes back and forth across the parish. The whole parish is around 33 feet (10 m) above sea level, in the strip of former coastal marsh known as the Lincolnshire Marsh. Beesby was once known as Beesby in the Marsh.

Local democracy takes the form of a Parish Meeting.
