= The Magnificent Seventh! =

Studio album by Thunder
- Released: 21 February 2005
- Recorded: June – August 2004
- Studio: Chapel Studios (South Thoresby, Lincolnshire, England); Chez Bez Studios (London, England)
- Genre: Hard rock; heavy metal
- Length: 53:36
- Label: STC
- Producer: Luke Morley

Thunder studio album chronology
Shooting at the Sun (2003)	The Magnificent Seventh! (2005)	Robert Johnson's Tombstone (2006)

Singles from The Magnificent Seventh!
- 1. "I Love You More Than Rock 'n' Roll" Released: 22 November 2004

The Magnificent Seventh! is the seventh studio album by English hard rock band Thunder. Recorded from June to August 2004, it was produced the band's lead guitarist Luke Morley and engineered and mixed by Rupert Coulson. The album was released in the UK by the band's own label STC Recordings on 21 February 2005, in Europe by Frontiers Records the following day, in Japan by Victor Entertainment on 28 March and worldwide on iTunes on 13 April.

Following the release and promotion of Shooting at the Sun in 2003, their first album since reforming the previous year, Thunder took a brief hiatus as vocalist Danny Bowes and guitarist Luke Morley released their second collaboration album Mo's Barbeque, and bassist Chris Childs and drummer Gary "Harry" James released their first album with Shadowman, Land of the Living. The group returned in early 2004 to begin recording their seventh studio album.

The Magnificent Seventh! debuted at number 70 on the UK Albums Chart and number 5 on the UK Rock & Metal Albums Chart. "I Love You More Than Rock 'n' Roll" was released as the only single from the album on 22 November 2004, reaching number 27 on the UK Singles Chart and topping the UK Rock & Metal Singles Chart. The album was promoted on a concert tour between March 2005 and February 2006, featuring shows in the UK, Europe and Japan.

== Background ==
Recording took place for The Magnificent Seventh! between June and August 2004, during which time the band took a break to play a number of festivals in Europe alongside bands such as Deep Purple and Status Quo, as well as two headline appearances in the UK. Production took place at Chapel Studios in South Thoresby, Lincolnshire and the band's own Chez Bez Studios in London, with the group's lead guitarist Luke Morley producing and Rupert Coulson engineering alongside second guitarist and keyboardist Ben Matthews. In November, the band supported Deep Purple on a nine-date tour of the UK.

"I Love You More Than Rock 'n' Roll" was released as the only single from the album on 22 November 2004. It debuted at number 27 on the UK Singles Chart – the band's first UK top 30 since 1997 – and topped the UK Rock & Metal Singles Chart. The Magnificent Seventh! was released in the UK by STC Recordings on 21 February 2005, in Europe by Frontiers Records the following day, in Japan by Victor Entertainment on 28 March and worldwide on iTunes on 13 April. It debuted at number 70 on the UK Albums Chart, number 5 on the UK Rock & Metal Albums Chart, and number 76 on the Scottish Albums Chart.

== Critical reception ==
Professional ratings
Review scores
Source	Rating
AllMusic	3.5/5 stars
musicOMH	Favourable

Reviewing the album for AllMusic, Greg Prato claimed that on The Magnificent Seventh!, "Unlike some other acts from the hair metal era who decided to update their sound upon returning to the scene in the early 21st century, Thunder continue on in the melodic rock direction they've followed all along, as evidenced by such tracks as "I Love You More Than Rock n' Roll" and "Monkey See, Monkey Do." musicOMH writer Neil Daniels hailed the album as "a terrific return to form" for Thunder, describing it as "a hard-hitting giant but with fists of steel and cast iron balls" and "an exciting, sweat drenched journey".

== Track listing ==
All tracks are written by Luke Morley, except where noted

No.	Title	Length
1.	"I Love You More Than Rock 'n' Roll"	4:44
2.	"The Gods of Love"	4:46
3.	"Monkey See, Monkey Do"	6:04
4.	"I'm Dreaming Again"	4:40
5.	"Amy's on the Run"	4:09
6.	"The Pride"	4:23
7.	"Fade into the Sun"	5:21
8.	"Together or Apart"	6:02
9.	"You Can't Keep a Good Man Down"	4:27
10.	"One Foot in the Grave"	4:23
11.	"One Fatal Kiss" (co-written by Russ Ballard)	4:37
Total length:		53:36

Japanese edition bonus track
No.	Title	Length
12.	"Love's an Easy Word to Say"	5:21
Total length:		58:57

== Personnel ==
- Danny Bowes – vocals
- Luke Morley – guitar, backing vocals, production
- Ben Matthews – guitar, keyboards, engineering
- Chris Childs – bass
- Gary "Harry" James – drums, percussion
- Rupert Coulson – engineering, mixing
- Hugh Gilmour – artwork, design

== Charts ==
Chart (2005)	Peak position
Scottish Albums (OCC)	22
UK Albums (OCC)	70
UK Rock & Metal Albums (OCC)	2

Chart (2024)	Peak position
UK Independent Albums (OCC)	13

== Bibliography ==
- McIver, Joel (October 2016), Giving the Game Away: The Thunder Story, London, England: Omnibus Press (published 11 November 2016), ISBN 978-1785581373
