= Aby for Claythorpe railway station =

Former railway station in Lincolnshire, England

Coordinates: 53.29025°N 0.11600°E

Aby for Claythorpe
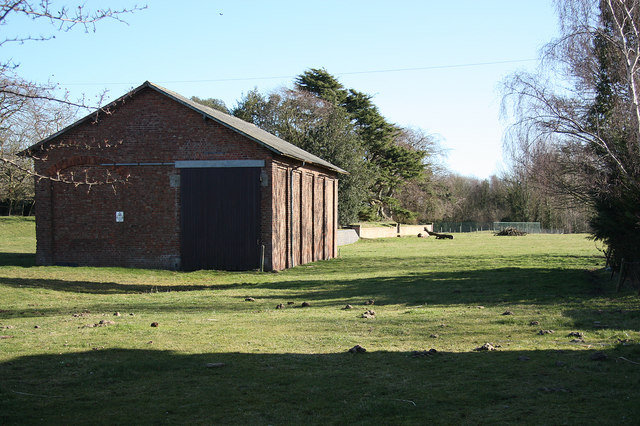
- Former goods shed in March 2010.

General information
- Location: Aby, East Lindsey; England
- Platforms: 3

Other information
- Status: Disused

History
- Original company: East Lincolnshire Railway
- Pre-grouping: Great Northern Railway
- Post-grouping: London and North Eastern Railway; Eastern Region of British Railways

Key dates
- 3 September 1848: Opened as Claythorpe
- 1 November 1885: Renamed Aby for Claythorpe
- 11 September 1961: Closed
Location

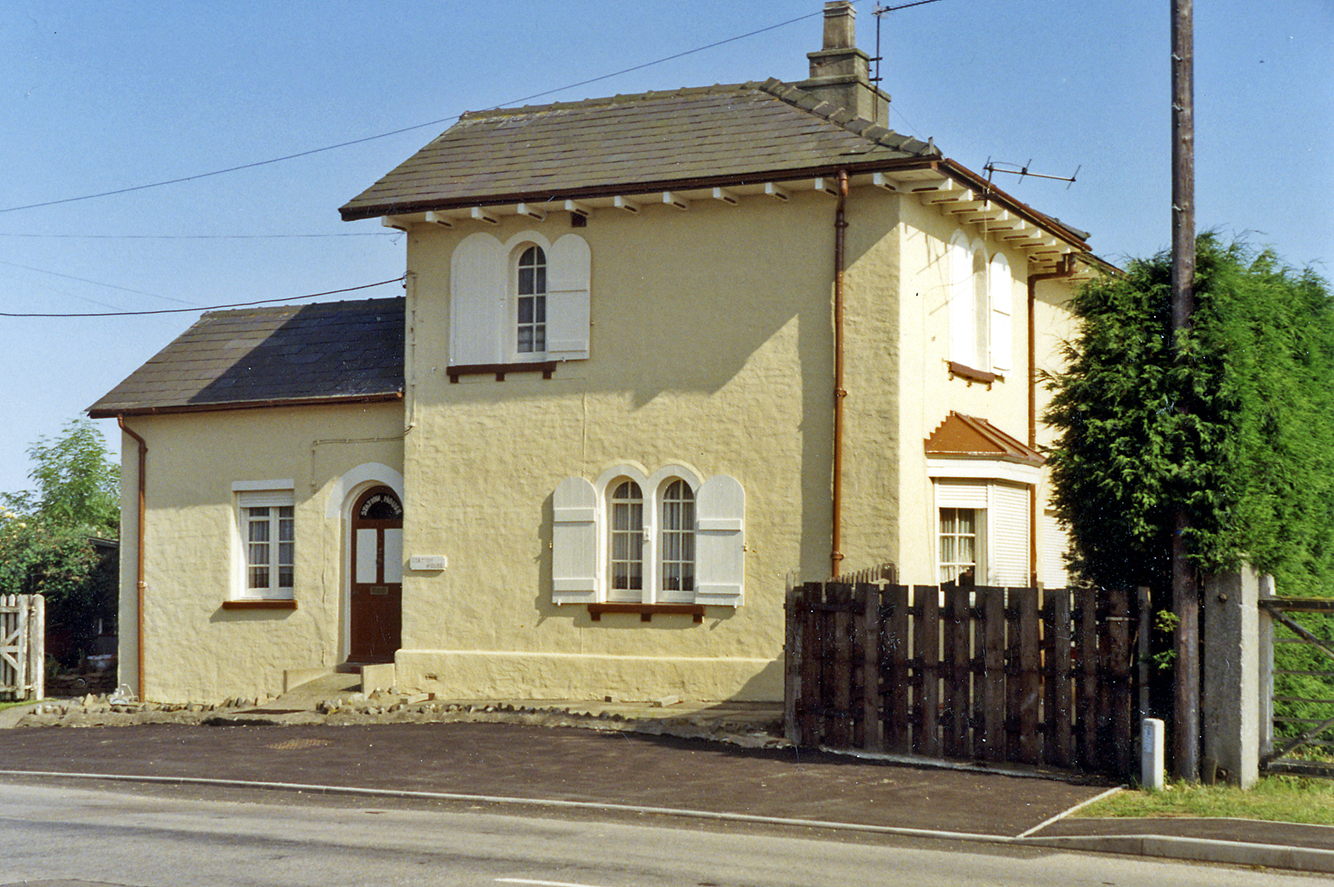
The former station house in 1992

Aby for Claythorpe was a railway station on the East Lincolnshire Railway which served the hamlets of Aby and Claythorpe in Lincolnshire between 1848 and 1961. It originally opened as Claythorpe, but was renamed in 1885. Withdrawal of goods facilities took place in 1961, on the same day that the station was closed to passengers. The line through the station is closed.

== History ==
The station was opened on 3 September 1848 as Claythorpe after the settlement of Claythorpe, and was renamed in November 1885 to Aby after the nearby hamlet of Aby. It was constructed by Peto and Betts civil engineering contractors who, in January 1848, had taken over the contract to construct the section of the East Lincolnshire Railway between Louth and Boston from John Waring and Sons. This section was the last to be completed in September 1848 at an agreed cost of £123,000 (equivalent to £15,600,000 in 2023). The station was provided with parallel platforms to the north of a skew level crossing, with the stationmaster's house situated on the south side of the crossing on the down side. Adjacent to the stationmaster's house, which contained a booking office, was a short low platform which may have been used by rail motors. On the opposite side of the line was a signal box bearing the name Aby, which may have been the shortest name for any signal box in the country. The box controlled the crossing and a goods yard with a goods shed and a 1½-ton crane. The yard, which was the largest at the three stations between Louth and Alford Town, was the first to close, on 11 September 1961. The station closed to passengers on the same day.

Preceding station	Disused railways	Following station
Authorpe; Line and station closed	Great Northern Railway; East Lincolnshire Line	Alford Town; Line and station closed

== Present day ==
The stationmaster's house has survived as a private residence, and the goods shed is still standing. The low platform in front of the stationmaster's house is still extant, but the parallel platforms have been removed and the land returned to agriculture. To the south, the bridge which carried the line over Great Eau also remains.

== Sources ==
- Butt, R. V. J. (October 1995). The Directory of Railway Stations: details every public and private passenger station, halt, platform and stopping place, past and present (1st ed.). Sparkford: Patrick Stephens Ltd. ISBN 978-1-85260-508-7. OCLC 60251199. OL 11956311M.
- Clinker, C.R. (October 1978). Clinker's Register of Closed Passenger Stations and Goods Depots in England, Scotland and Wales 1830-1977. Bristol: Avon-Anglia Publications & Services. ISBN 0-905466-19-5.
- Hill, Roger; Vessey, Carey (1999) [1996]. British Railways Past and Present: Lincolnshire (No. 27). Kettering, Northants: Past & Present Publishing Ltd. ISBN 978-1-85895-083-9.
- Ludlam, A.J. (1991). The East Lincolnshire Railway (Locomotive Papers No. 82). Headington, Oxford: The Oakwood Press. ISBN 0-85361-416-4.
- Conolly, W. Philip (2004) [1958]. British Railways Pre-Grouping Atlas and Gazetteer. Hersham, Surrey: Ian Allan Ltd. ISBN 978-0-7110-0320-0.
- Stennett, Alan (2007). Lost Railways of Lincolnshire. Newbury, Berkshire: Countryside Books. ISBN 978-1-84674-040-4.
