= Driby =

Village in the East Lindsey district of Lincolnshire, England

Coordinates: 53.250000°N 0.093334°E

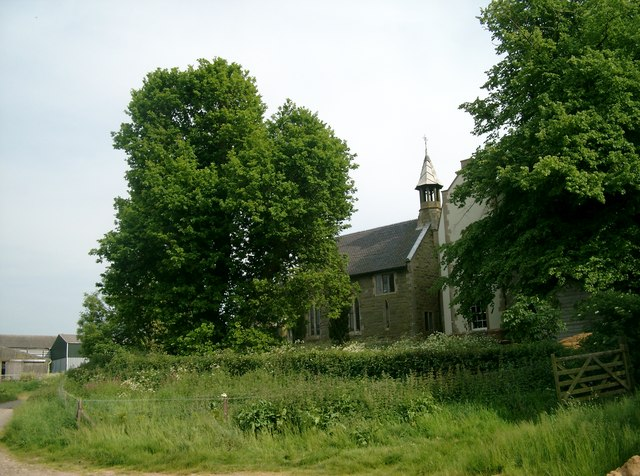
- Former Church of St Michael, Driby

- Location within Lincolnshire
- OS grid reference: TF390745
  - London: 120 mi (190 km) S
- Civil parish: South Thoresby
- District: East Lindsey
- Shire county: Lincolnshire
- Region: East Midlands
- Country: England
- Sovereign state: United Kingdom
- Post town: Alford
- Postcode district: LN13
- Police: Lincolnshire
- Fire: Lincolnshire
- Ambulance: East Midlands
- UK Parliament: Louth and Horncastle

Driby is a village and former civil parish, now in the parish of South Thoresby, in the East Lindsey district of Lincolnshire, England. It is situated 4 miles (6.4 km) west from the town of Alford. In 1961 the parish had a population of 42. On 1 April 1987 the parish was abolished and merged with South Thoresby.

Driby church was dedicated to Saint Michael, rebuilt in 1849–50, closed by the Diocese of Lincoln during the 20th century, and now a private house. It is a Grade II listed building.
