= Calceby =

Village in Lincolnshire, England

Coordinates: 53.259025°N 0.0819°E

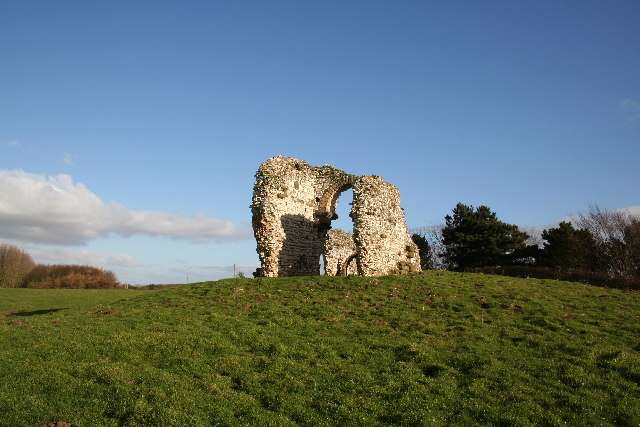
- Ruins of St Andrew's Church, Calceby

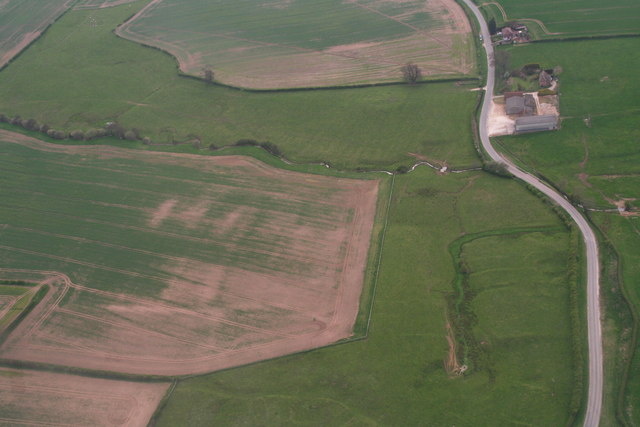
- Calceby brook and spring. The source of the Great Eau

- Location within Lincolnshire
- OS grid reference: TF389755
  - London: 120 mi (190 km) S
- Civil parish: South Thoresby
- District: East Lindsey
- Shire county: Lincolnshire
- Region: East Midlands
- Country: England
- Sovereign state: United Kingdom
- Post town: Alford
- Postcode district: LN13
- Police: Lincolnshire
- Fire: Lincolnshire
- Ambulance: East Midlands

Calceby is a small village and former civil parish, now in the parish of South Thoresby, in the East Lindsey district of Lincolnshire, England. It is situated approximately 4 miles (6 km) west from the market town of Alford. In 1961 the parish had a population of 32. On 1 April 1987 the parish was abolished and merged with South Thoresby. Once much larger, Calceby is recorded in the Domesday Book as "Calesbi". Lord of the manor in 1086 was Earl Hugh of Chester. By the early seventeenth century, the conversion of agriculture from corn to pasture had begun a process of depopulation of the parish.

In 1638 the vicar said that his meagre income from tithes (£13 16s 6d per annum) could only be increased if the village were to be repopulated. The parish church of St Andrew is now in ruins, the last service to take place there being in 1692. Maurice Beresford included Calceby in his "Lost Villages of England".

Calceby Beck & Spring are the source of the Great Eau, and are part of the local network of Chalk Streams.

Calceby Marsh has been designated a Site of Special Scientific Interest (SSSI) as "an outstanding example of base-rich marsh". The site consists of three areas of marshland, each differing slightly in species composition and surrounded by grassland of value to breeding snipe and lapwing.

Calceby Marsh SSSI is owned by the Diocese of Lincoln
