= Robert Johnson's Tombstone =

Studio album by Thunder
- Released: 30 October 2006
- Studio: Chapel Studios (South Thoresby, Lincolnshire, England); Chez Bez Studios (London, England); El Relaxo (Mijas, Málaga, Spain); Tackle Out Studios (London, England)
- Genre: Hard rock; heavy metal
- Length: 52:40
- Label: STC
- Producer: Luke Morley

Thunder studio album chronology
The Magnificent Seventh! (2005)	Robert Johnson's Tombstone (2006)	Bang! (2008)

Singles from Robert Johnson's Tombstone
- 1. "The Devil Made Me Do It" Released: 4 December 2006

Robert Johnson's Tombstone is the eighth studio album by English hard rock band Thunder. Recorded at Chapel Studios in South Thoresby, Chez Bez and Tackle Out Studios in London, and the El Relaxo villa in Mijas, Spain, it was produced by the band's lead guitarist Luke Morley. The album was released in the UK by STC Recordings on 30 October 2006, in Europe by Frontiers Records on 10 November, and in Japan by Victor Entertainment on 26 February 2007.

Thunder began working on material for the follow-up to The Magnificent Seventh! in November 2005, during the promotional touring cycle for the album. After the final run of shows on the tour ended in February 2006, the band continued work on the album at a rented villa in Mijas, Málaga using a portable Pro Tools recording station purchased a few years previous. The group's second guitarist and keyboardist Ben Matthews engineered and mixed the entire record.

Robert Johnson's Tombstone debuted at number 56 on the UK Albums Chart and number 6 on the UK Rock & Metal Albums Chart. "The Devil Made Me Do It" was released as the only single from the album on 4 December 2006, reaching number 40 on the UK Singles Chart and number 2 on the UK Rock & Metal Singles Chart. The album was promoted on a concert tour between November 2006 and September 2007, featuring shows in the UK, Europe and Japan.

== Recording and production ==
Thunder started the "first stage of recording" for their eighth studio album on 29 November 2005, shortly before embarking on the second European leg of the tour for their seventh studio album, The Magnificent Seventh!, on 6 December. Production took place at Chapel Studios in South Thoresby, Lincolnshire, Chez Bez and Tackle Out Studios in London, and a rented villa in Mijas, Málaga, Spain called "El Relaxo". The Mijas sessions took place in early 2006 and saw the group using a portable recording setup they had purchased a couple of years prior. Speaking about the system, the band's vocalist Danny Bowes recalled that "We spent a lot of money on a portable Pro Tools system so that we could plug everything in and record ... I knew how useful it would be to have the ability to record and mix our own records anywhere we wanted."

Recalling how he conceived the concept for Robert Johnson's Tombstone, the band's lead guitarist, producer and primary songwriter Luke Morley explained that it "came about when I was helping Andy Taylor's son ... with some demos and advice, down in Exeter. I was driving home and listening to one of those late-night Radio 2 programmes about the blues. The guy was talking about the blues musician Robert Johnson and the stories of a bottle of poison, a bottle of whisky and a prostitute being involved in his death, and I thought, "This is so rock 'n' roll!" So I got home and started researching Johnson, and it went from there." The album's opening title track features lyrics written in reference to Johnson's mysterious death – Morley recalls that "all the ingredients in his story, true or false, make it a great one to tell and embellish". Prior to its release, Bowes dubbed the album "a natural continuation of the last record", describing its sound as "rootsy and blues based, sexy and dirty, and sad and melancholy in places too".

== Promotion and release ==
Robert Johnson's Tombstone was released in the UK by the band's own label STC Recordings on 30 October 2006. It debuted at number 56 on the UK Albums Chart, number 6 on the UK Rock & Metal Albums Chart, and number 61 on the Scottish Albums Chart. The album was released in Europe by Frontiers Records on 10 November, and in Japan by Victor Entertainment on 26 February 2007, with four additional bonus tracks. Outside of the UK, it reached number 105 on the Oricon Albums Chart in Japan – the first Thunder studio album to chart in the region. "The Devil Made Me Do It" was released as the only single from Robert Johnson's Tombstone on 4 December 2006. It was the band's 18th and to date latest release to reach the top 40 of the UK Singles Chart, peaking at number 40. It also reached number 2 on the UK Rock & Metal Singles Chart, behind Muse's "Knights of Cydonia". The album was promoted on a concert tour beginning in the UK in November 2006, including dates in Europe and Japan.

== Critical reception ==
Professional ratings
Review scores
Source	Rating
AllMusic	3.5/5 stars

Reviewing the album for AllMusic, Stewart Mason claimed that on Robert Johnson's Tombstone, "Thunder return to what made them, if not famous, then at least reasonably well known in certain circles: punchy three-chord hard rock delivered with maximum swagger and minimum fuss". Highlighting tracks such as "Andy Warhol Said" and "Last Man Standing", the writer concluded that "While [the album] won't win Thunder any new acolytes, fans will be entirely pleased".

== Track listing ==
All tracks are written by Luke Morley, except where noted

No.	Title	Length
1.	"Robert Johnson's Tombstone"	4:28
2.	"Dirty Dream"	4:30
3.	"A Million Faces"	4:55
4.	"Don't Wanna Talk About Love"	5:47
5.	"The Devil Made Me Do It"	4:20
6.	"Last Man Standing" (co-written by Chris Childs)	6:55
7.	"My Darkest Hour"	3:27
8.	"Andy Warhol Said"	5:10
9.	"What a Beautiful Day"	4:03
10.	"It's All About You"	4:43
11.	"Stubborn Kinda Love"	4:22
Total length:		52:40

Japanese edition bonus tracks
No.	Title	Length
12.	"Fade Into the Sun" (live)	5:58
13.	"I Love You More Than Rock 'n' Roll" (live)	6:09
14.	"I'm in Heaven"	3:28
15.	"The Girl Is Alright"	3:50
Total length:		72:05

== Personnel ==
- Danny Bowes – vocals
- Luke Morley – guitar, backing vocals, percussion, production, art direction
- Ben Matthews – guitar, keyboards, engineering, mixing
- Chris Childs – bass, art direction
- Gary "Harry" James – drums, percussion
- Rob Crane – artwork
- Jason Joyce – photography

== Charts ==
Chart (2006)	Peak position
Japanese Albums (Oricon)	105
Scottish Albums (OCC)	23
UK Albums (OCC)	56
UK Rock & Metal Albums (OCC)	1

Chart (2024)	Peak position
UK Independent Albums (OCC)	12

== Bibliography ==
- McIver, Joel (October 2016), Giving the Game Away: The Thunder Story, London, England: Omnibus Press (published 11 November 2016), ISBN 978-1785581373
