= Legbourne =

Village in East Lindsey district, Lincolnshire, England

Coordinates: 53.338573°N 0.053557°E

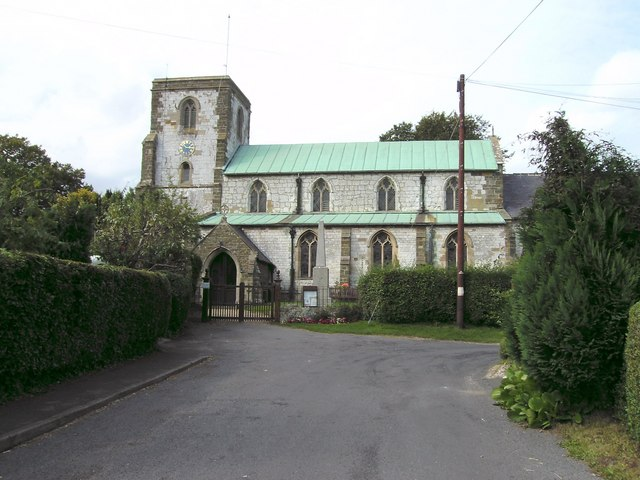
- All Saints Church, Legbourne

- Location within Lincolnshire
- Population: 644 (2011 Census)
- OS grid reference: TF368843
  - London: 130 mi (210 km) S
- Civil parish: Legbourne
- District: East Lindsey
- Shire county: Lincolnshire
- Region: East Midlands
- Country: England
- Sovereign state: United Kingdom
- Post town: Louth
- Postcode district: LN11
- Dialling code: 01507
- Police: Lincolnshire
- Fire: Lincolnshire
- Ambulance: East Midlands
- UK Parliament: Louth and Horncastle

Legbourne is a village and civil parish in the East Lindsey district of Lincolnshire, England, about 3 miles (5 km) south-east of the town of Louth.

== History ==
The Priory of Legbourne was founded by Robert Fitz Gilbert of Tathwell about 1150, apparently to receive Cistercian sisters known as the "Nuns of Keddington" (sometimes Haddington). The priory was officially dissolved in 1536, although still occupied by nuns at the time of the Lincolnshire Rising, when they were dragged out by a mob.

The original priory endowment consisted of lands belonging to Robert Fitz Gilberts fee in Tathwell, Legbourne and Hallington, and the churches of Farlesthorpe, Saltfleetby St Peter, Raithby, Hallington, Somercotes and Conisholme, with half that of Legbourne. The priory site is in the grounds of Legbourne Abbey, at present a private house. The only visible remains of the original building are earth mounds.

== Governance and population ==
An electoral ward of the same name stretches north-west to Elkington. It had a population of 1,891 at the 2011 census.

Legbourne's population of 280 in 1801 rose to 511 in 1841, then slowly declined to 347 in 1961. It then rose again to 644 in 2011, and an estimated 653 in 2019.

== Landmarks ==
Legbourne church, built about 1380, is dedicated to All Saints. A Grade I listed building, it was extensively rebuilt in 1865. The church clock was presented by Thomas Cheney Garfitt in 1890. It is a member of the Legbourne Woldmarsh group of rural parishes, acting as its hub. A service of Holy Communion or Matins is held on most Sunday mornings.

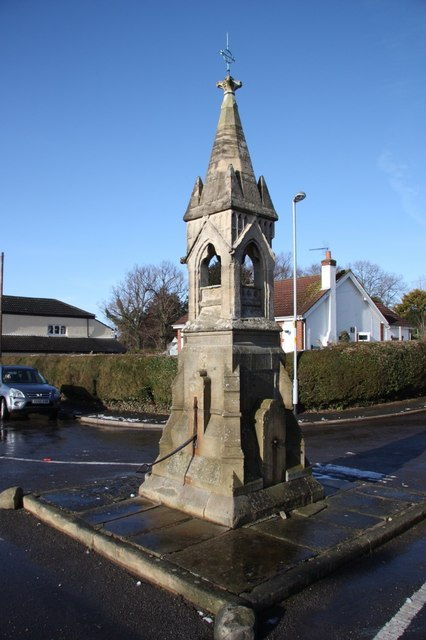
Legbourne village pump

The village pump, Grade II listed, is a canopied and pinnacled stone structure in front of the church, built by Canon J. Overton in 1877 in memory of his mother. It was the main supply of water to the village until 1953, when mains water arrived.

Legbourne tower mill, also Grade II listed, was built by Thomas Davy in 1847 after an older post mill burned down. It is now a dwelling.

Legbourne Wood is one of the few ancient woodlands in eastern Lincolnshire and the largest of the Lincolnshire Wildlife Trust woodland nature reserves. The Lincolnshire Trust bought the wood in 2004. Its canopy is ash and oak. Beneath the trees, over 60 species of wild flowers have been recorded, including primrose, early purple orchid, bluebell, wood anemone, sweet woodruff, wood sorrel and lesser celandine.

There is a varied bird population in Legbourne Wood, including one of the largest heronries in the county.

== Transport ==
The village lies on the main A157 road between Louth and Mablethorpe. There are four weekday buses a day between them calling at Legbourne, with connections at Louth for Lincoln.

Legbourne Road railway station was built in 1863 for the Great Northern Railway, but closed in 1970. The level crossing has disappeared, but the station house survives as a private residence. The nearest operating station is at Cleethorpes 21 miles (34 km).

== Amenities ==
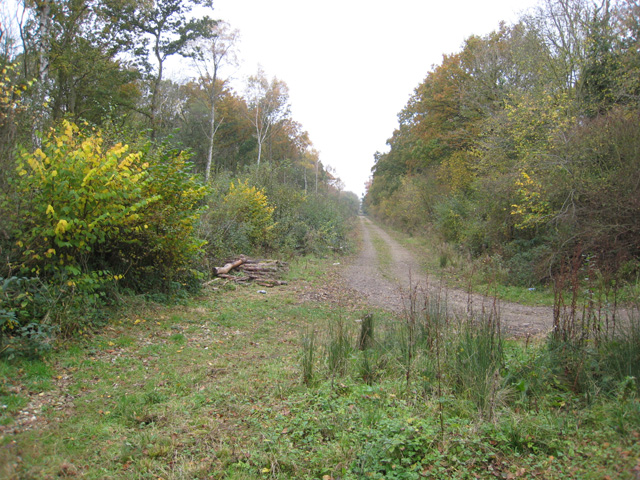
Legbourne Wood Nature Reserve

Legbourne and Little Cawthorpe Community Centre was built in 1990 as a sports and functions hall. Its playing fields are used also for outdoor events.

The village no longer has a post office but there is a general store. The Queens Head Inn closed in 2012 but re-opened in 2015. Since 1982 there has been a trout farm in the village.

== Education ==
The village has a day nursery and an out-of-school club. East Wold Church of England Primary School, built in 1993, serves Legbourne and surrounding villages.
