= Elizabeth Dawbarn =

English nurse and religious writer died 1939

Elizabeth Dawbarn (died 1839) was an English nurse and pamphleteer from Wisbech, Cambridgeshire. She wrote about the nature of Christ, the influence that women can exert on men, and the rights and needs of young children. Her works were distributed through the English Baptist movement.

== Life ==
Born as Elizabeth Saltonstall, she had come from Alford, Lincolnshire and was described as "a lady of substance". She is said to have been the only surviving member of a family descended from Samuel Saltonstall, the elder brother of Richard Saltonstall, Lord Mayor of London from 1597 to 1598.

Little is known of her before she married Richard Bunbury Dawbarn of Wisbech, Cambridgeshire on 30 April 1782. She then encouraged her husband to leave the Church of England and join the Particular Baptist congregation in Wisbech. He later became a Baptist preacher. Their eight children were Mary (1783–1828), Thomas (1785–1863), Richard (1786–1826), John (1789–1849), Elizabeth (born 1790), Ann (1795–1863), Robert (1799–1888) and Frances (died 1801). Her husband predeceased her in 1829 at the age of 72.

A later pamphlet of hers on child care is addressed to her daughter Elizabeth. Little more is known of her private life.

== Works ==
Dawbarn's religious writings, addressed to children and to adults, are centred on the Old Testament, and are intended to demonstrate "the historical and symbolic connection between the Old and the New Testaments". The Eternal Existence of the Son of God (1800) shows parallel literal and symbolic readings of the Old Testament in its treatment of Proverbs 8.

In the Young Person's Assistant in Reading the Old Testament (published in 1806, second edition 1816) Dawbarn writes in the person of a mother to her children. She underlines the importance of instilling Christianity into them and pauses to define difficult terms and passages. Her work on the nature of Christ probably dates from 1800, and that on The Rights of Infants; or, a Letter from a mother to a daughter, relative to the nursing of infants from 1805. The latter presses for the importance of infant care and of kindly commonsense in applying it.

Dawbarn's earlier anonymous, Dialogue between Clara Neville and Louisa Mills, on Loyalty (1794) is strongly conservative in its preference for monarchy over liberty. It underlines the importance to God of comforting the poor and the influence that women can exert over men in this respect. In 1805 she published an anthology of writings against the theatre: Sentiments selected from Writers of Ancient and Modern Celebrity concerning Theatrical Amusements. Presented to Mrs. T. Robertson, author of "An Answer to the Effusions of Gratitude, &c."

Dawbarn's writings were published locally in Wisbech, but they were disseminated more widely through the Baptist movement.

== Note ==
Elizabeth Yelverton of Liverpool married Elizabeth Dawbarn's grandson William Dawbarn in 1843, becoming another Elizabeth Dawbarn.
