= Beaumont Jarrett =

English footballer

Personal information
- Full name: Beaumont Griffith Jarrett
- Date of birth: 18 July 1855
- Place of birth: London, England
- Date of death: 11 April 1905
- Position: Half back

Senior career*
Years	Team	Apps	(Gls)
- Cambridge University

International career
1876–1878	England	3	(0)
- * Club domestic league appearances and goals

Beaumont Griffith Jarrett (18 July 1855 – 11 April 1905) was an English footballer who earned three caps for the national team between 1876 and 1878. Jarrett played club football for Cambridge University.

Born in Cheapside, London, Jarret was educated at Harrow School and Christ's College, Cambridge. He played football for Cambridge University between 1875 and 1878, becoming captain in 1877. He also played for Old Harrovians and Grantham Town.

Jarrett played for the Old Harrovians in the 1877–78 FA Cup semi-final and was the Royal Engineers-nominated umpire for the final.

Jarret was ordained in 1878 and continued his career with the church in Lincolnshire, having been ordained deacon in 1878 and priest in 1880 by the Bishop of Lincoln. He was curate at Coningsby from 1878 to 1882, vicar of Swinstead from 1883 to 1895 and rector of Belleau from 1895 until his death, aged 49, in April 1905.
