= Greenfield Priory =

Cistercian priory in Lincolnshire, England

Coordinates: 53°16′45″N 0°08′49″E

Greenfield Priory was a Cistercian priory in Greenfield, near Aby, Lincolnshire, England.

It was founded before the year 1153 by Eudo of Grainsby and Ralf of Aby, and his son, Ranulf earl of Chester was also a benefactor of the house.

The bishop visited the priory in 1294 and asked the prioress to resign. Her successor, Cecily de Parys, was not much better, for in 1303 Bishop Dalderby heard that she had been absent from her house for two years, and that it was in danger of serious loss. She resigned in 1305.

A moat, which is nearly complete and mainly water filled, is believed to have surrounded the priory remains, and traces of other earthworks are visible on air photographs.

== Burials ==
- Robert de Welles, 2nd Baron Welles
- Adam de Welles, 1st Baron Welles
