= Alford Town railway station =

Former railway station in Lincolnshire, England

Coordinates: 53.2565°N 0.1667°E

Alford Town
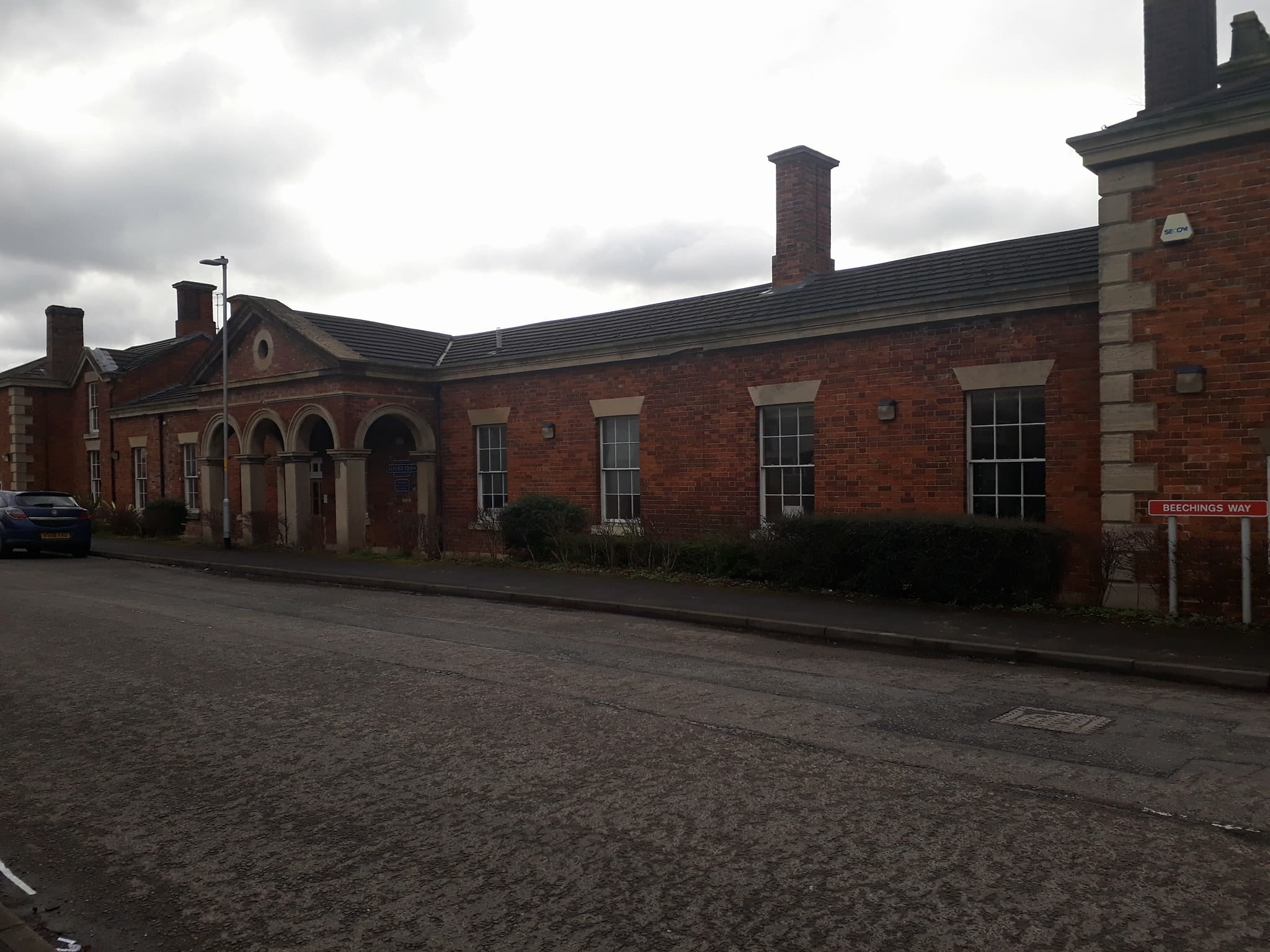
- Station frontage on the Beeching Industrial Estate; now a showroom.

General information
- Location: Alford, East Lindsey; England
- Platforms: 2

Other information
- Status: Disused

History
- Opened: 3 September 1848; 177 years ago (as Alford)
- Closed: 2 May 1966; 59 years ago (Closed to goods traffic); 5 October 1970; 55 years ago (Closed to passenger traffic)
- Original company: East Lincolnshire Railway
- Pre-grouping: Great Northern Railway
- Post-grouping: London and North Eastern Railway; Eastern Region of British Railways

Key dates
- 1 July 1923; 102 years ago: Renamed Alford Town
Location

Alford Town was a railway station on the East Lincolnshire Railway which served the town of Alford in Lincolnshire between 1848 and 1970. It originally opened as Alford, but was renamed in 1923. When passenger services were withdrawn in 1970 the line through the station was closed.

== History ==
The station was opened on 3 September 1848 as Alford after the town of Alford, and renamed following the railway grouping in 1923 to Alford Town to distinguish it from Alford on the Alford Valley Railway and Alford Halt on the Langport and Castle Cary Railway. It was constructed by Peto and Betts civil engineering contractors who, in January 1848, had taken over the contract to construct the section of the East Lincolnshire Railway between Louth and Boston from John Waring and Sons. This section was the last to be completed in September 1848 at an agreed cost of £123,000 (£16.7 million in 2023). The station was served by the Alford and Sutton Tramway to Sutton-on-Sea from 2 April 1884 to 7 December 1889.

The station building is similar in style to that at Firsby. Access was through a three-arch portico entrance which led to a passageway to the up platform, a large parcels office and the booking office. The southern end of the station comprised the stationmaster's quarters and the ladies' waiting room. Twin facing platforms were provided; a general waiting room, storeroom, stationmaster's office and porter's room were located on the up platform. The platforms were initially covered by a roof which was subsequently replaced after the Second World War. A signal box was situated on the up side next to the road crossing to the north-west of the station. Behind the up platform lay a goods yard with a loading dock, goods shed capable to taking 9 wagons which also served as a grain store and a 15-ton crane. The shed and crane were destroyed during a bombing raid in the Second World War, which led to Alford's only wartime casualty: the shunt horse driver who was on fire watch in the yard.

The July 1922 timetable saw seven up and six down weekday services, plus one Sunday service each way, call at Alford. By 1953, Alford was dealing with 50-60 passenger and goods trains per day. These included ironstone trains from the High Dyke area of Lincoln (see Woolsthorpe-by-Colsterworth) to the Frodingham Ironworks, and coal trains from Colwick. The station was closed to goods traffic on 2 May 1966 and to passengers on 5 October 1970.

Preceding station	Disused railways	Following station
Aby for Claythorpe; Line and station closed	Great Northern Railway; East Lincolnshire Line	Willoughby; Line and station closed

== Present day ==
The trackbed is partly the driveway to a new house next to the site of a former level crossing. The station building is now part of the aptly named Beeching's Way Industrial Estate. The main buildings were, in 1995, occupied by John White (Alford) Printers, which used a workshop erected across part of the trackbed and abutting the station building. The remaining section of the trackbed to the rear of the station has been infilled and used as a car park. The platform roof has been removed In 2009, the station building and attached industrial unit were sold to Jackson's Building Centres and reopened as building suppliers. The station building has been extensively restored externally.

== Sources ==
- Butt, R. V. J. (October 1995). The Directory of Railway Stations: details every public and private passenger station, halt, platform and stopping place, past and present (1st ed.). Sparkford: Patrick Stephens Ltd. ISBN 978-1-85260-508-7. OCLC 60251199. OL 11956311M.
- Clinker, C.R. (October 1978). Clinker's Register of Closed Passenger Stations and Goods Depots in England, Scotland and Wales 1830-1977. Bristol: Avon-Anglia Publications & Services. ISBN 0-905466-19-5.
- Hill, Roger; Vessey, Carey (1999) [1996]. British Railways Past and Present: Lincolnshire (No. 27). Kettering, Northants: Past & Present Publishing Ltd. ISBN 978-1-85895-083-9.
- Ludlam, A.J. (1991). The East Lincolnshire Railway (Locomotive Papers No. 82). Headington, Oxford: The Oakwood Press. ISBN 0-85361-416-4.
- Conolly, W. Philip (2004) [1958]. British Railways Pre-Grouping Atlas and Gazetteer. Hersham, Surrey: Ian Allan Ltd. ISBN 978-0-7110-0320-0.
- Stennett, Alan (2007). Lost Railways of Lincolnshire. Newbury, Berkshire: Countryside Books. ISBN 978-1-84674-040-4.
