= Authorpe railway station =

Former railway station in Lincolnshire, England

Coordinates: 53.3045°N 0.0959°E

Authorpe
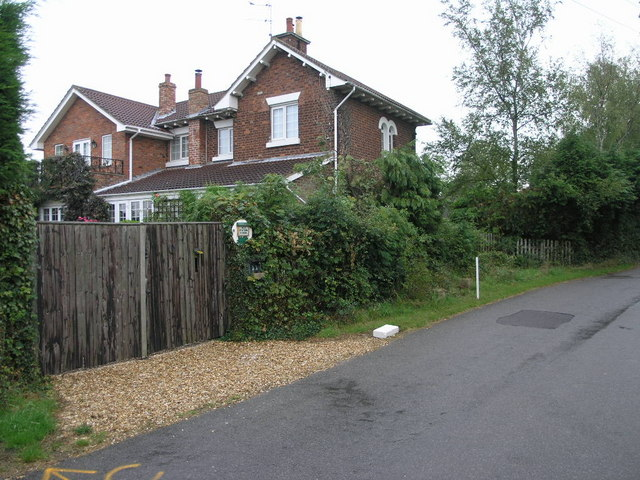
- Station building in 2006.

General information
- Location: Authorpe, East Lindsey; England
- Platforms: 2

Other information
- Status: Disused

History
- Original company: East Lincolnshire Railway
- Pre-grouping: Great Northern Railway
- Post-grouping: London and North Eastern Railway; Eastern Region of British Railways

Key dates
- 3 September 1848: Opened
- 11 September 1961: Closed to passengers
- 30 March 1964: Goods facilities withdrawn
Location

Authorpe was a railway station on the East Lincolnshire Railway, which served the village of Authorpe in Lincolnshire between 1848 and 1964. The station was closed to passengers in 1961, and withdrawal of goods facilities took place in 1964. The line through the station is closed.

== History ==
The station was opened on 3 September 1848 after the hamlet of Authorpe which lies to the east. It was constructed by Peto and Betts civil engineering contractors who, in January 1848, had taken over the contract to construct the section of the East Lincolnshire Railway between Louth and Boston from John Waring and Sons. This section was the last to be completed in September 1848 at an agreed cost of £123,000 (equivalent to £15,600,000 in 2023). Authorpe station was one mile to the north of Aby for Claythorpe station and straddled a level crossing over Scrub Lane which runs through the centre of Authorpe. Staggered platforms were situated either side of the crossing gates, which were controlled by a signal box located on the down side of the line and to the north of the crossing. The signal box also controlled the goods yard opposite the up platform which comprised two sidings; the station dealt with a variety of goods including livestock. Opposite the signal box on the north side of the crossing was the stationmaster's house incorporating a booking office. A small brick waiting shelter was provided for passengers using the up platform. The station was closed to passengers on 11 September 1961, the same day as Aby for Claythorpe, but goods facilities remained for a further two-and-a-half years until 30 March 1964.

Preceding station	Disused railways	Following station
Legbourne Road; Line and station closed	Great Northern Railway; East Lincolnshire Line	Aby for Claythorpe; Line and station closed

== Present day ==
The stationmaster's house has survived as a private residence and has been extended. The trackbed adjacent to the house is now incorporated into the garden, comprised within which is the down platform. The degraded remains of the up platform remain in an overgrown state. It is also possible that the goods shed may have survived.

== Sources ==
- Butt, R. V. J. (October 1995). The Directory of Railway Stations: details every public and private passenger station, halt, platform and stopping place, past and present (1st ed.). Sparkford: Patrick Stephens Ltd. ISBN 978-1-85260-508-7. OCLC 60251199. OL 11956311M.
- Clinker, C.R. (October 1978). Clinker's Register of Closed Passenger Stations and Goods Depots in England, Scotland and Wales 1830-1977. Bristol: Avon-Anglia Publications & Services. ISBN 0-905466-19-5.
- Conolly, W. Philip (2004) [1958]. British Railways Pre-Grouping Atlas and Gazetteer. Hersham, Surrey: Ian Allan Ltd. ISBN 978-0-7110-0320-0.
- Hill, Roger; Vessey, Carey (1999) [1996]. British Railways Past and Present: Lincolnshire (No. 27). Kettering, Northants: Past & Present Publishing Ltd. ISBN 978-1-85895-083-9.
- Ludlam, A.J. (1991). The East Lincolnshire Railway (OL82). Headington, Oxford: The Oakwood Press. ISBN 0-85361-416-4.
- Stennett, Alan (2007). Lost Railways of Lincolnshire. Newbury, Berkshire: Countryside Books. ISBN 978-1-84674-040-4.
