= Saleby =

Village in Lincolnshire, England

Coordinates: 53.285°N 00.187°E

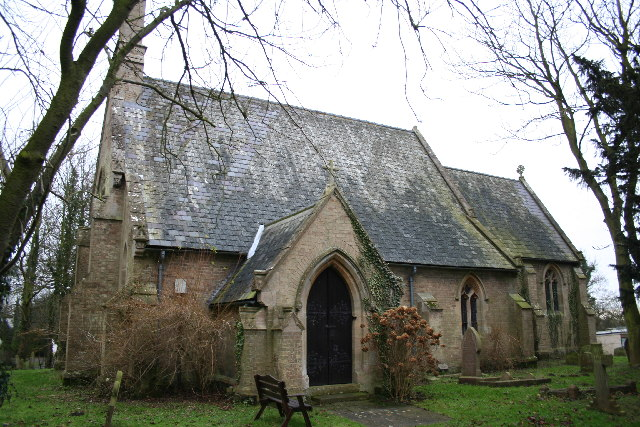
- Parish church of St Margaret

- Location within Lincolnshire
- OS grid reference: TF458786
  - London: 125 mi (201 km) S
- Civil parish: Beesby with Saleby
- District: East Lindsey
- Shire county: Lincolnshire
- Region: East Midlands
- Country: England
- Sovereign state: United Kingdom
- Post town: ALFORD
- Postcode district: LN13
- Police: Lincolnshire
- Fire: Lincolnshire
- Ambulance: East Midlands
- UK Parliament: Louth and Horncastle

Saleby is a village in the civil parish of Beesby with Saleby, in the East Lindsey district of Lincolnshire, England. It is on the Alford road to Louth, about 2 miles (3 km) north-east of Alford and 11 miles (18 km) south-east of Louth. The hamlet of Thoresthorpe is about 1 mile (1.6 km) south of the village.

The Domesday Book of 1086 records "Saleby", with the Lord of the manor as Guy de Craon.

The Church of England parish church of St Margaret was rebuilt in 1850 buff brick to the designs of Stephen Lewin, and was further restored in 1958. St Margaret's is a Grade II listed building. In the chancel is a recess containing a full-length effigy of a knight in chain mail and surcoat, a memorial to Sir William de Hardreshull who died in 1303.

In the chancel floor is a brass with the inscription: "to John Haryinton of Wickham, in the county of Lincoln, who built this chapel, 1592, being lord and patron of Salebie and lieth in st Sepulchres church, London and died 12th May 1599". At the east end of the chancel is the datestone of the old chapel bearing the Haryinton Arms and dated 1591.

The base and shaft of a stone churchyard cross are in the churchyard.

A National School was built in the village in 1845; it appears to have closed in 1932.
