= Aby with Greenfield =

Civil parish in the East Lindsey district of Lincolnshire, England

Coordinates: 53.28°N 0.13°E

Aby with Greenfield is a civil parish in the East Lindsey district of Lincolnshire, England. The population of the civil parish at the 2011 Census was 196. It consists of the villages of Aby and Greenfield. The parish is situated approximately 7 miles (11 km) south-east from Louth.

== Greenfield ==
Greenfield was a hamlet and chapelry, with a church dedicated to Saint Mary. According to a field investigator's report from 1964: "There are no surface indications of desertion - other than the Priory - nor is there local knowledge or tradition of a village and church".

Greenfield Priory was a Cistercian nunnery founded before 1153 and suppressed in 1536.
