= Tony Richardson (footballer, born 1943) =

English footballer (1943–2007)

Personal information
- Full name: Anthony Frederick Richardson
- Date of birth: 5 November 1943
- Place of birth: Alford, England
- Date of death: 29 August 2007 (aged 63)
- Place of death: Spain
- Position: Centre forward

Senior career*
Years	Team	Apps	(Gls)
1960–1961	Nottingham Forest	0	(0)
1961–1962	Cheltenham Town		
1962–1963	Bradford City	2	(1)
- Ramsgate Athletic
- * Club domestic league appearances and goals

Anthony Frederick Richardson (5 November 1943 – 29 August 2007) was an English professional footballer who played as a centre forward.

== Career ==
Born in Alford, Richardson spent his early career with Nottingham Forest and Cheltenham Town. He joined Bradford City in May 1962, making 2 league appearances for the club, before moving to Ramsgate Athletic in February 1963.

== Sources ==
- Frost, Terry (1988). Bradford City A Complete Record 1903-1988. Breedon Books Sport. ISBN 0-907969-38-0.
