= Shooting at the Sun =

Studio album by Thunder
- Released: 3 March 2003
- Recorded: October – December 2002
- Studio: Jacobs Studios (Farnham, England)
- Genre: Hard rock; heavy metal
- Length: 50:44
- Label: STC
- Producer: Luke Morley

Thunder studio album chronology
| Giving the Game Away (1999) | Shooting at the Sun (2003) | The Magnificent Seventh! (2005) |

Singles from Shooting at the Sun
- 1. "Loser" Released: 19 May 2003

Shooting at the Sun is the sixth studio album by English hard rock band Thunder. Recorded from October to December 2002 at Jacobs Studios in Farnham, it was produced the band's lead guitarist Luke Morley and engineered and mixed by Rupert Coulson. The album was initially released online by the band's own label STC Recordings on 3 March 2003, followed by a physical release in Japan by Victor Entertainment on 5 March and in Europe by Frontiers Records on 7 April.

Following the release and promotion of the band's fifth studio album Giving the Game Away in 1999, Thunder disbanded in May 2000. The group spent two years on hiatus, before reuniting for a Monsters of Rock tour in November 2002 and recording their sixth studio album. Shooting at the Sun was written entirely by Luke Morley, with Winterville frontman Peter Shoulder the only co-writing credit on "The Man Inside". Morley and Shoulder would later form The Union in 2009.

Shooting at the Sun failed to register on the UK Albums Chart, although lead single "Loser" reached number 48 on the UK Singles Chart, number 5 on the UK Independent Singles Chart, number 3 on the UK Rock & Metal Singles Chart and number 48 on the Scottish Singles Chart. The album was promoted on two UK concert tours in mid to late 2003 – one in May and another in November – followed by a number of European shows the following year in January, May and July.

== Background and recording ==
After disbanding two years earlier, in July 2002 Thunder announced that they were due to reunite in November for a Monsters of Rock tour headlined by Alice Cooper, although it was described by the band's vocalist Danny Bowes as "a non permanent reformation". Despite this statement, lead guitarist Luke Morley proposed that the band record a new album, to which Bowes was initially opposed. The vocalist began managing the band upon their return, while they formed their own record label STC Recordings after drummer Gary "Harry" James claimed that they had "been fucked around by record companies so much in the past that it made sense to do it all ourselves". According to Bowes, "STC stands for Straight Talk Company, because I give you the news the same way: whether it's good or bad, I give it to you straight".

Recording for Shooting at the Sun began in October and was completed in December after the conclusion of the Monsters of Rock tour. The album was recorded and mixed at Jacobs Studios in Farnham, Surrey, with Morley producing and Rupert Coulson engineering and mixing the record. During the tour, the band released a limited edition extended play (EP) called Back for the Crack, featuring new tracks "Somebody Get Me a Spin Doctor", "Blown Away", "The Pimp and the Whore" and "When Tomorrow Comes". The EP was self-funded by the band and initially limited to 1,000 copies, which sold out in three days; according to Bowes, the quick sales of the collection made him rethink the idea of recording a full-length album, claiming that it "seemed to make obvious sense". The first three tracks were featured on the album.

== Promotion and release ==
Shooting at the Sun was initially released by the band's new label STC Recordings on 3 March 2003, although was only available online. It received a full release just over a month later on 7 April, by STC in the UK, Victor Entertainment in Japan and Frontiers Records in Europe. Upon its retail release, the album debuted at number 24 on the UK Rock & Metal Albums Chart and number 28 on the UK Independent Albums Chart, although it failed to register on the main UK Albums Chart. The only single from Shooting at the Sun, "Loser", was released on 19 May 2003 alongside a music video featuring model Kate Groombridge. The single registered at number 48 on the UK Singles Chart, number 3 on the UK Rock & Metal Singles Chart, and number 5 on the UK Independent Singles Chart.

The Shooting at the Sun Tour began on 18 May 2003 in Glasgow, with the opening UK leg of the tour featuring six shows and ending in Cambridge on 24 May. "Part 2" of the album's promotional tour featured eleven shows in the UK between 17 and 30 November, including a sold out performance at the London Astoria. After the band played two Christmas shows at London's Bedford Arms in December which were recorded for a live album released the following year, Shadowman's debut album Land of the Living was released, featuring drummer Harry James and bassist Chris Childs, Bowes & Morley released their second album together, Mo's Barbecue, and Childs was also featured on The Stand's Moon and the Sun. A number of shows in Europe followed in January, May and July 2004.

== Critical reception ==
Professional ratings
Review scores
| Source | Rating |
|---|---|
| AllMusic | 3.5/5 stars |

Reviewing the album for AllMusic, Eduardo Rivadavia hailed Shooting at the Sun as "arguably [Thunder's] best, most eclectic collection of new songs since 1992's sophomore triumph, Laughing on Judgement Day". The writer highlighted the songs "Loser" (described as "a cleverly self-deprecating love song in the vintage Thunder mold") and "Blown Away" (which he claimed "builds impressively from a whisper to a roar"), although criticised tracks including "Everybody's Laughing" and "The Pimp and the Whore". Rivadavia concluded his review positively, suggesting that the album "did wonders to reenergise [the band's] loyal audience" despite its lack of commercial success.

== Track listing ==
All tracks are written by Luke Morley, except where noted

| No. | Title | Length |
|---|---|---|
| 1. | "Loser" | 5:10 |
| 2. | "Everybody's Laughing" | 4:04 |
| 3. | "If I Can't Feel Love" | 4:51 |
| 4. | "Shooting at the Sun" | 4:43 |
| 5. | "The Pimp and the Whore" | 4:15 |
| 6. | "A Lover, Not a Friend" | 4:21 |
| 7. | "Shake the Tree" | 4:23 |
| 8. | "Somebody Get Me a Spin Doctor" | 4:40 |
| 9. | "The Man Inside" (co-written by Peter Shoulder) | 4:30 |
| 10. | "Out of My Head" | 4:16 |
| 11. | "Blown Away" | 5:31 |
| Total length: | | 50:44 |

European digipak edition bonus tracks
| No. | Title | Length |
|---|---|---|
| 12. | "River of Pain" (live) | 4:08 |
| 13. | "Somebody Get Me a Spin Doctor" (live) | 5:01 |
| Total length: | | 59:53 |

== Personnel ==
- Danny Bowes – vocals
- Luke Morley – lead guitar, acoustic guitar, backing vocals, percussion, production
- Ben Matthews – rhythm guitar, keyboards
- Chris Childs – bass
- Gary "Harry" James – drums, percussion
- Angela Murrell – backing vocals (track 2)
- Peter Shoulder – backing vocals (track 2)
- Roop Caulson – backing vocals (track 2)
- T.J. Davis – backing vocals (track 2)
- Rupert Coulson – engineering, mixing
- Martin Yates – artwork, design
- Jason Joyce – photography

== Charts ==
| Chart (2003) | Peak position |
|---|---|
| UK Independent Albums (OCC) | 28 |
| UK Rock & Metal Albums (OCC) | 24 |

| Chart (2023) | Peak position |
|---|---|
| Scottish Albums (OCC) | 23 |
| UK Independent Albums (OCC) | 17 |
| UK Rock & Metal Albums (OCC) | 6 |

== Bibliography ==
- McIver, Joel (October 2016), Giving the Game Away: The Thunder Story, London, England: Omnibus Press (published 11 November 2016), ISBN 978-1785581373
