= Queen Elizabeth's Grammar School, Alford =

Location
- Station Road; Alford, Lincolnshire, LN13 9HY; England
- Coordinates: 53°15′31″N 0°10′12″E

Information
- Type: Grammar school; Academy
- Motto: Cor Unum Via Una
- Established: 1566; 460 years ago
- Founder: Francis Spanning, Sir William Cecil
- Department for Education URN: 136315 Tables
- Head teacher: Glen Thompson
- Staff: 39 teaching 21 administrative
- Gender: Mixed
- Age: 11 to 18
- Enrolment: 544 pupils (2021)
- Colour
- Website: http://www.qegs.co.uk/

Queen Elizabeth's Grammar School, Alford (QEGS) is a selective, co-educational, academy status grammar school with sixth form in Alford, Lincolnshire, England. In 2021, the school held 544 pupils.

The school motto is Cor Unum Via Una which translates from Latin to English as: "One heart, one way." It is also the title of the school song.

== Organisation of the school ==
Currently the school has one headteacher and three assistant headteachers, all of whom make up members of the senior leadership team (SLT). There is one head of lower school (Years 7-8), one head of middle school (Years 9-11) and one head of sixth form. There is also one second in middle school. There are 12 Subject leaders. Altogether, there are 39 teachers (including subject leaders and SLT).

In each year there are approximately 90 students, apart from the sixth form years, each of which contain approximately 60 students. There are three houses that make up the school: Spanning, Cecil and Travers. Each year is divided into three, with equal numbers in all houses

== History ==
The school was first established in 1566 with the donation of £50 from an Alford merchant. In 1576 a charter was granted by Queen Elizabeth I "for the Education, Instruction and bringing up of children and Youth for ever to continue."

Diana, wife of Sir Archibald Montgomery-Massingberd, gave out the prizes in July 1927. Former Olympic rower, Ralph Shove, gave out the prizes on Friday 21 July 1950.

In September 1951 it became a voluntary controlled school, as it had to find £50,000 for new buildings, and being voluntary-aided would mean incurring more of that cost.

In July 1954 the prizes were handed out by Sir Raymond Hatherell Fooks, the chief constable. In July 1958 the head of the FA, Sir Stanley Rous, and a former grammar school sports teacher, presented the prizes, later head of FIFA from 1961 to 1974.

=== New buildings ===
By 1955 the new buildings required would cost £70,000. In November 1955, the government gave £70,000 for new buildings, to start construction in 1956, to accommodate 330 boys and girls, a two-form entry. 150 boys were at the school in the late 1950s. By 1957 it would cost £85,000, with work to start in September 1957.

In one block there would be a gym, two rooms, a domestic science room, and staff room on the ground floor. On the first floor would be four rooms and two science labs. The dining room would be converted into a wood and metal work room. Seven more teachers would be needed.

Construction started on Monday 27 October 1958, built by J.T. Barber & Son of Boston, in preparation for the admittance of girls.

=== Coeducational school ===
80 girls joined the school, with 150 boys, on Monday 14 September 1959.

In March 1960, the school produced its first coeducational drama production, A Midsummer Night's Dream. John Hartoch, from Hillside Avenue in Sutton-on-Sea, the son of an Alford bank manager, played the part of Puck; Hartoch would study English and History at Keele University, later working at the RSC and the Bristol Old Vic Theatre School, as a theatre director.

On Friday 10 June 1960 much-needed new buildings were officially opened by the headmaster of Manchester Grammar School, Eric James, Baron James of Rusholme. Since 1939 the deputy head had been Mr TH Williams, who had taught at Manchester Grammar School.

In July 1964 the headmaster's brother, William Dyer, presented the prizes; at the time, he was the Sheriff of Nottingham (position). Lord Burghley, the Olympic 440 yards hurdler, attended the 400th anniversary in March 1966.

The school attained grant-maintained status in 1989, and in 1999 was given Foundation status.

== Headteachers ==
- William Sutterby
- Richard Spenley
- John Shaw
- 1704, Rev Richard Sugar, until 1775
- 1863, Rev Charles Underwood Dasent (19 June 1844 - 2 February 1895), vicar of South Thoresby from 1870; when curate of Ludford, on 25 March 1856, he married in Martley in Worcestershire; his older brother was Sir George Webbe Dasent, who married the sister of the Times editor John Thadeus Delane
- 1881, Canon Walter William Hopwood, until 1884; in January 1885 he became the headteacher of Louth Grammar School from 1885 to 1900; he died on 12 January 1917, aged 82, his nephew was Francis Hopwood, 1st Baron Southborough; his third son, Richard Graham Hopwood, married Julietta Marian Tennyson, at All Saints South Elkington on 10 October 1905, whose father Julius George Tennyson, was the nephew of Lord Tennyson
- January 1885, Rev William Horn, a Maths teacher, became the vicar of All Saints at Waltham, Lincolnshire, died 19 February 1929, aged 74
- January 1906, John Anderson Staley, Cambridge-educated, the former head of science at Sandbach Grammar School until February 1932; he married Mary Whittingham on 25 April 1906 in Market Rasen, and died on Monday 8 October 1951 aged 79, at his home, 12 Park Lane; he was a lay-preacher, and was on the local rural council as the chairman
- May 1932, Ephraim Parker Oakes (1903-60), he had been head of Mathematics at Stamford School since 1925; he became the headteacher of Sir Roger Manwood's School, in Kent, in September 1935; he died at the end of January 1960, being headteacher in Kent for 25 years
- September 1935, Henry James Herbert Dyer, he attended Leamington College, a few years above Frank Whittle; he stood for Erdington in 1929 for the Liberals when a teacher at King Henry VIII School, Coventry, and had also taught at Huntingdon Grammar School; he had moved from Grange High School in September 1935, where he was a senior history master; in 1935 there were 65 boys at the school; he joined the Labour Party in 1943, and represented Lincolnshire on the Church Association; his brother William George Ernest Dyer stood for the Liberals in the 1943 Daventry by-election, in 1945 in Daventry, and in 1950 in Bassetlaw, and awarded the CBE in the 1963 New Year Honours; Henry Dyer stood for Labour in Louth in 1950, aged 48, and 1951, and had been on Alford Urban District Council since 1938, being the chairman; he was awarded the MBE in the 1982 New Year Honours, and grew up in Eathorpe in Warwickshire; he retired in July 1967 after 32 years; he was the chairman of East Lindsey District Council from 1979, being vehemently opposed the comprehensive system, which led him to join the Conservative group; in January 1958 he had claimed that the 11-plus selection procedure was '90% successful'; he died on Wednesday 22 November 1995, aged 93, at his home in East Street, he had studied history at university
- September 1967, 38-year-old David Spearman, originally from Merseyside, an English teacher at Watford Grammar School for Boys for the previous four years
- c.1974, Ray Rundle
- 1990, Richard Pryce, the former deputy head,

== Notable former pupils ==
- Sir Ralph Griffith
- Glenn Kirkham, England national team and GB hockey player
- Sir Eric Riches, urologist (left in 1909), his father William Riches was the deputy head under Mr Staley
- Ted Smith (conservationist), who founded The Wildlife Trusts
- Air Marshal Sir John Sutton KCB, Lieutenant Governor of Jersey 1990-05

== Former teachers ==
- Francis Marbury in 1585
