= Little Cawthorpe =

Village and civil parish in the East Lindsey district of Lincolnshire, England

Coordinates: 53.3332°N 0.0364°E

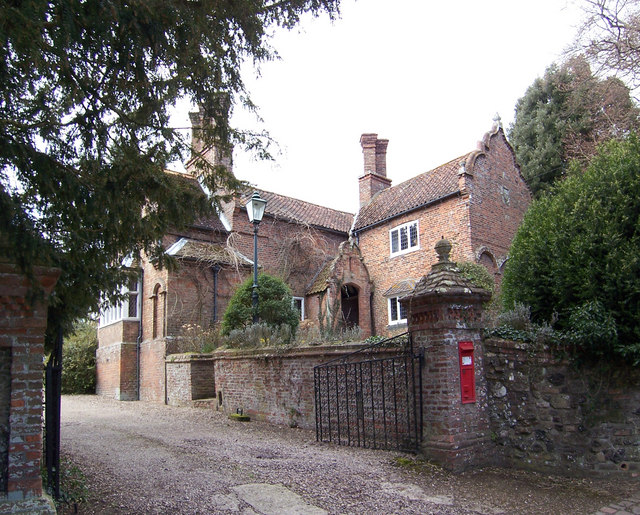
- The Manor House, Little Cawthorpe

- Location within Lincolnshire
- Population: 163 (2011 census)
- OS grid reference: TF356988
  - London: 130 mi (210 km) S
- Civil parish: Little Cawthorpe
- District: East Lindsey
- Shire county: Lincolnshire
- Region: East Midlands
- Country: England
- Sovereign state: United Kingdom
- Post town: Louth
- Postcode district: LN11
- Police: Lincolnshire
- Fire: Lincolnshire
- Ambulance: East Midlands
- UK Parliament: Louth and Horncastle

Little Cawthorpe is a village and civil parish in the East Lindsey district of Lincolnshire, England. It is situated about 1.5 miles (2.4 km) south-west from Legbourne, and 3 miles (5 km) south-east from the market town of Louth.

Little Cawthorpe red-brick church, dedicated to St Helen, was built in 1860 by R. J. Withers to replace an earlier church. It was declared redundant in 1996 by the Diocese of Lincoln, and is a Grade II listed building.

The Manor House is a small red-brick country house dating from 1673 with some 20th-century alterations and additions, and is Grade II* listed. The gate piers to the Manor House are Grade II listed and also date from 1673, although the wrought iron gates are 20th-century.

The village public house is the 17th-century Royal Oak locally referred to as 'The Splash' due to the 200 metres (660 ft) long ford that runs adjacent to the premises. Kenwick Park Golf Club lies to the north of the village.

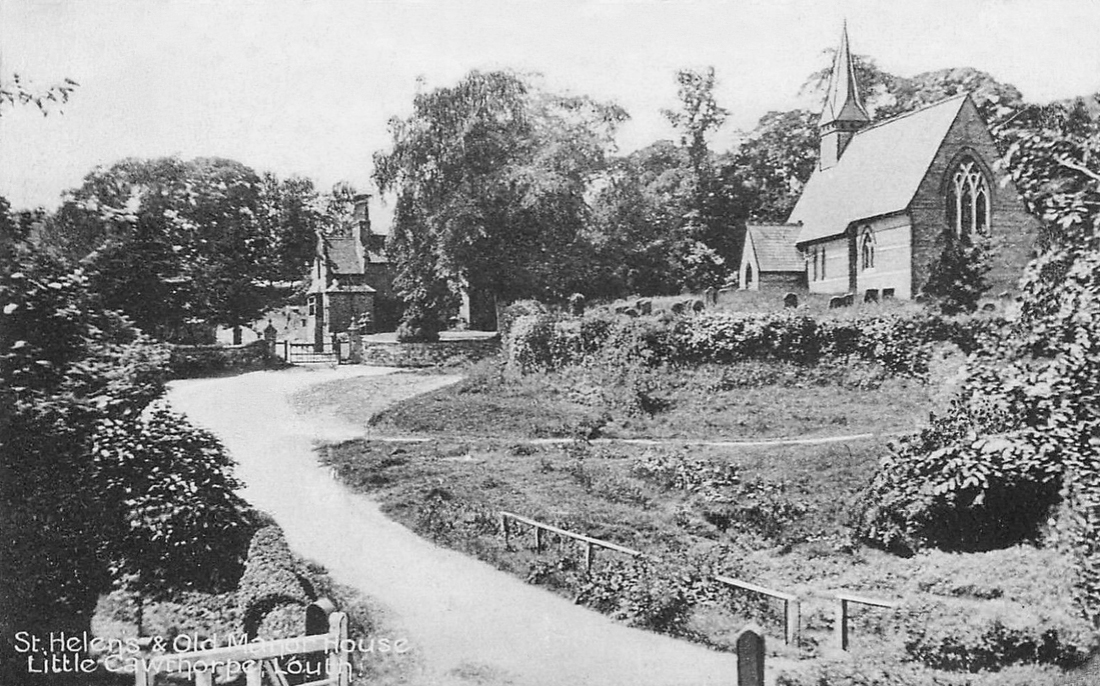
Road to St Helen's Church and The Manor House, 1916

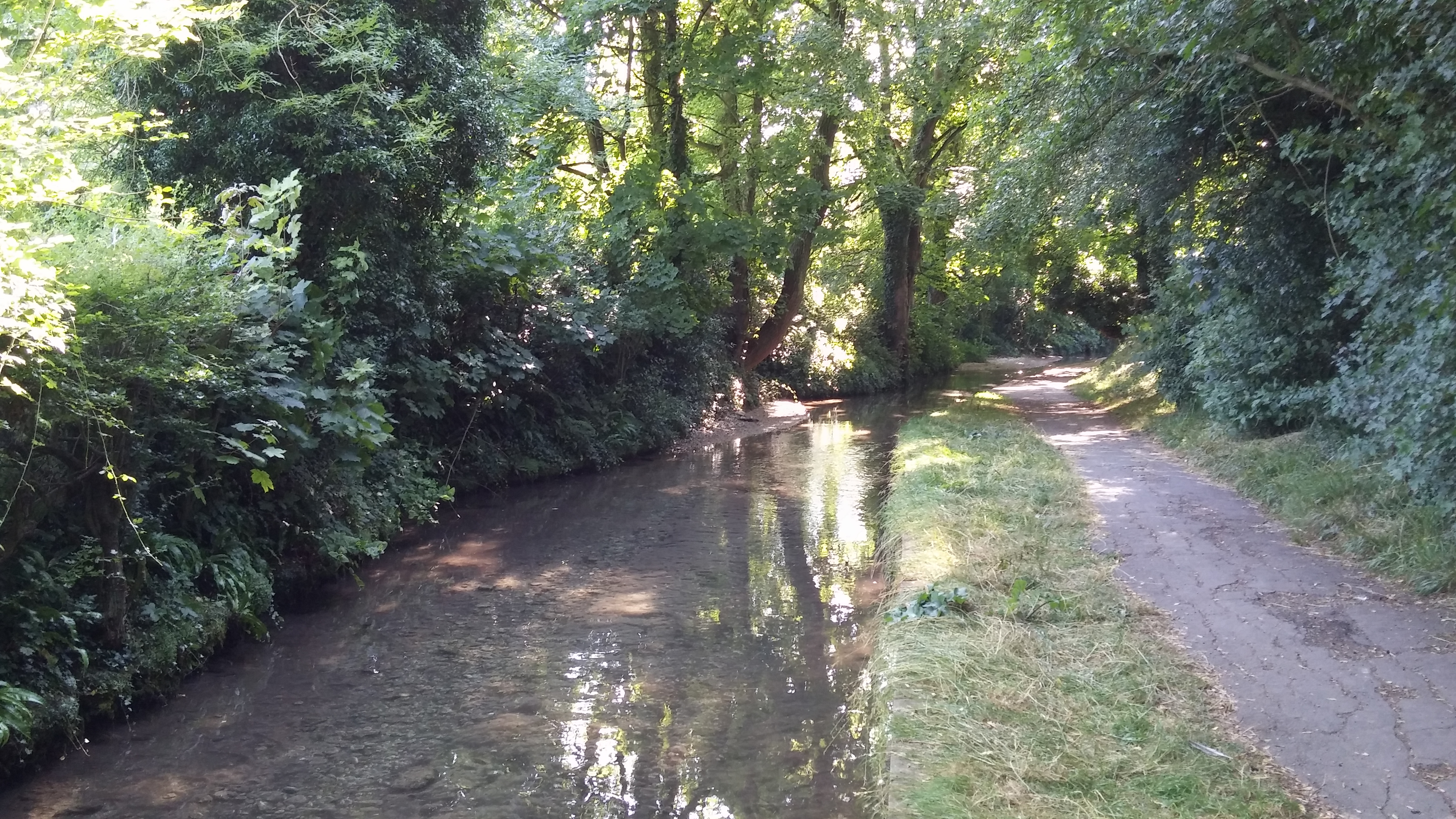
Ford between Watery Lane and Mill Lane
