= Hedgehog Care =

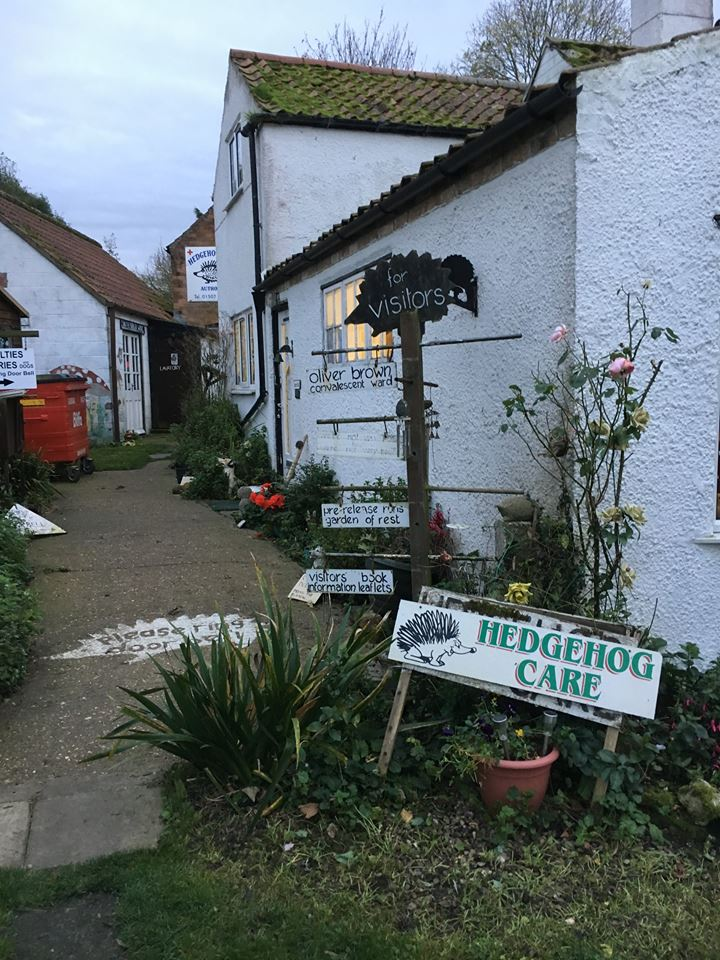
- Hedgehog Care in 2017

Hedgehog Care is a British animal welfare rescue, dedicated to the rescue and treatment of hedgehogs. It was founded in 1980 by Elaine Drewery, who continues to operate it. It started from small beginnings with her taking home injured hedgehogs she chanced upon. Then people began bringing animals they found to her and the rescue service grew from there. Drewery has been described as "the doyenne of England's hedgehog ladies" by the Wall Street Journal. Hedgehog Care describes itself as "Lincolnshire's Famous Little Hedgehog Hospital."

It is located in Authorpe, Lincolnshire. Hedgehog Care generally cares for 50–200 hedgehogs at any given time, and approximately 1,500 per year. The majority of the hedgehogs admitted come from the surrounding Louth area. Elaine Drewery welcomes visits from individuals and school parties, and gives talks to organisations such as the Scouts and the Women's Institute. Funds are raised through a second-hand clothes shop.

Hedgehog Care is known for providing aid and expertise to other hedgehog rescuers in the United Kingdom. It is endorsed by the UK organic growing charity Henry Doubleday Research Association which recommends its services for ill and injured animals.

== See also ==
- Tiggywinkles
