= Legbourne Road railway station =

Former railway station in Lincolnshire, England

Coordinates: 53.34158°N 0.03935°E

Legbourne Road
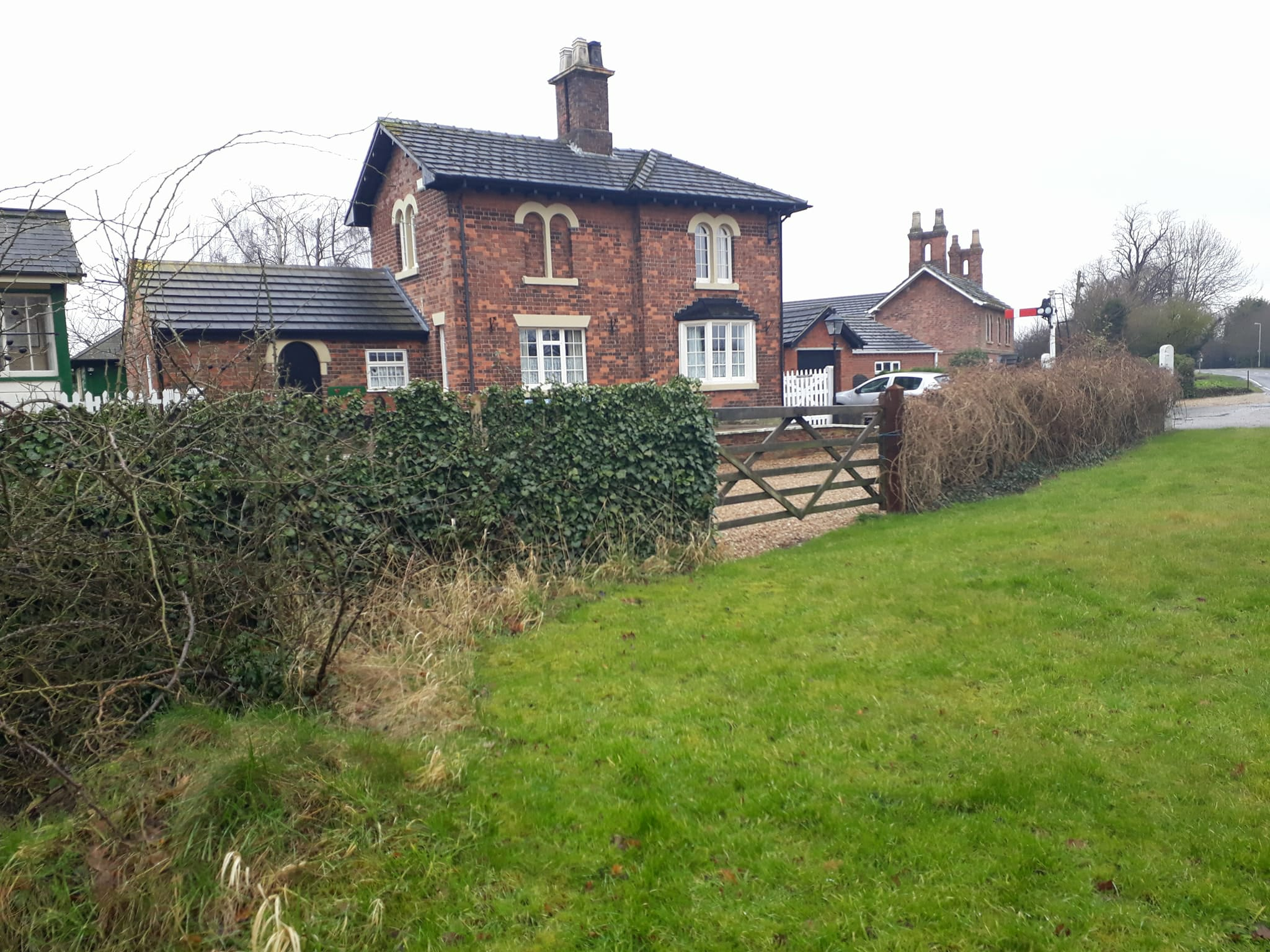
- Station building in 2018.

General information
- Location: Legbourne, East Lindsey; England
- Grid reference: TF359847
- Platforms: 2

Other information
- Status: Disused

History
- Original company: East Lincolnshire Railway
- Pre-grouping: Great Northern Railway
- Post-grouping: London and North Eastern Railway; Eastern Region of British Railways

Key dates
- 3 September 1848: Opened as Legbourne
- May 1880: Renamed
- 7 December 1953: Closed to passengers
- 15 June 1964: Goods facilities withdrawn
Location

Legbourne Road was a railway station on the East Lincolnshire Railway which served the village of Legbourne in Lincolnshire between 1848 and 1964. The station was closed to passengers in 1953, and withdrawal of goods facilities took place in 1964. The line through the station closed in 1970. The station once housed a museum containing railway memorabilia; this closed in 1998 and the building is once again a private residence.

== History ==
The station was opened on 3 September 1848 as Legbourne after the village of Legbourne which lies to the east on what is now the A157 road, and renamed in May 1880 in an acknowledgement that there was some distance between the village and the station. It was constructed by Peto and Betts civil engineering contractors who, in January 1848, had taken over the contract to construct the section of the East Lincolnshire Railway between Louth and Boston from John Waring and Sons. This section was the last to be completed in September 1848, at an agreed cost of £123,000 (equivalent to £15,600,000 in 2023). The line passed over two level crossings before it reached Legbourne village: the first over the A157 and the second over Mill Lane. The station was situated to the south of the first crossing which, despite its distance from the village, was possibly chosen because it was the more important of the two roads crossed.

As with other stations on the line, Legbourne was provided with staggered platforms situated either side of the crossing; a signal box lay on the northern side of the crossing and as well as controlling the gates, also regulated access to the two sidings on the side adjacent to the crossing, which were the station's only goods facilities. The station did not handle livestock. The stationmaster's house is similar in style to that found at other stations on the line and was sited adjacent to the crossing on the down side. The July 1922 timetable saw four up and down weekday services, plus one Sunday service each way, call at Legbourne Road. The station was closed to passengers on 7 December 1953, one of the first such closures on the East Lincolnshire Line, but goods facilities (downgraded to an unstaffed public siding) remained for a further ten-and-a-half years until 15 June 1964.

Preceding station	Disused railways	Following station
Louth; Line and station closed	Great Northern Railway; East Lincolnshire Line	Authorpe; Line and station closed

== Present day ==
The platforms were removed before closure and the signal box was demolished in December 1970. The main station building was later restored by Mike Legge as a museum housing a collection of railwayana. The museum acquired a signal box which had controlled the crossing of the Alford and Sutton Tramway by the Mablethorpe Loop Line at a point on the edge of Sutton-on-Sea. The box had survived the closure of both lines and had remained in the middle of a field until the 1980s. A large Great Northern-style building was constructed near the main station building; this is not original, but was built for the museum. The museum closed in 1998 upon the retirement of the owners and the contents auctioned, but the station remains in good condition as a private residence with the signal box visible from the road.

== Sources ==
- Butt, R. V. J. (October 1995). The Directory of Railway Stations: details every public and private passenger station, halt, platform and stopping place, past and present (1st ed.). Sparkford: Patrick Stephens Ltd. ISBN 978-1-85260-508-7. OCLC 60251199. OL 11956311M.
- Clinker, C.R. (October 1978). Clinker's Register of Closed Passenger Stations and Goods Depots in England, Scotland and Wales 1830-1977. Bristol: Avon-Anglia Publications & Services. ISBN 0-905466-19-5.
- Conolly, W. Philip (2004) [1958]. British Railways Pre-Grouping Atlas and Gazetteer. Hersham, Surrey: Ian Allan Ltd. ISBN 978-0-7110-0320-0.
- Ludlam, A.J. (1991). The East Lincolnshire Railway (OL82). Headington, Oxford: The Oakwood Press. ISBN 0-85361-416-4.
- Stennett, Alan (2007). Lost Railways of Lincolnshire. Newbury, Berkshire: Countryside Books. ISBN 978-1-84674-040-4.
