= Beesby, East Lindsey =

Village in the East Lindsey district of Lincolnshire, England

Coordinates: 53.29°N 00.11°E

Beesby
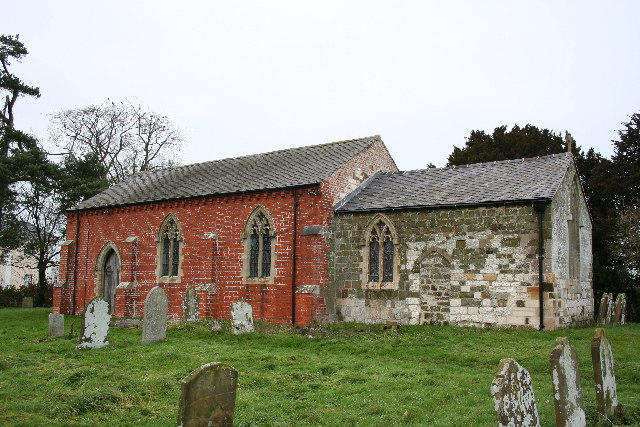
- Church of St Andrew, Beesby

- Location within Lincolnshire
- OS grid reference: TF4680
  - London: 125 mi (201 km) S
- Civil parish: Beesby with Saleby
- District: East Lindsey
- Shire county: Lincolnshire
- Region: East Midlands
- Country: England
- Sovereign state: United Kingdom
- Post town: Alford
- Postcode district: LN13
- Police: Lincolnshire
- Fire: Lincolnshire
- Ambulance: East Midlands
- UK Parliament: Louth and Horncastle

Beesby is a village and (as Beesby in the Marsh) a former civil parish, now in the parish of Beesby with Saleby, in the East Lindsey district of Lincolnshire, England. The village is situated approximately 4 miles (6 km) south-west from Mablethorpe, and just to the east of the A1104 road. In 1961 the parish had a population of 100. On 1 April 1987 the parish was abolished to form "Beesby with Saleby".

The Grade II listed parish church is dedicated to St Andrew.
