= South Thoresby =

Village and civil parish in the East Lindsey district of Lincolnshire, England

Coordinates: 53.27149°N 0.09942°E

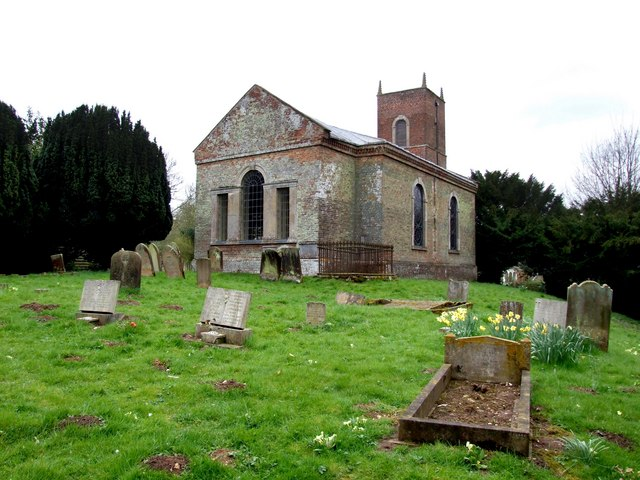
- St Andrew's Church, South Thoresby

- Location within Lincolnshire
- Population: 128 ( Including Calceby. 2011)
- OS grid reference: TF401770
  - London: 120 mi (190 km) S
- Civil parish: South Thoresby
- District: East Lindsey
- Shire county: Lincolnshire
- Region: East Midlands
- Country: England
- Sovereign state: United Kingdom
- Post town: Alford
- Postcode district: LN13
- Dialling code: 01507
- Police: Lincolnshire
- Fire: Lincolnshire
- Ambulance: East Midlands
- UK Parliament: Louth and Horncastle
- Website: http://www.south-thoresby.co.uk

South Thoresby is a village and civil parish in the East Lindsey district of Lincolnshire, England. It is situated 10 miles (16 km) north-east from Horncastle and 8 miles (13 km) south-east from Louth. Its population was 128 in 2011.

The village is the site of the studio where Arctic Monkeys recorded their debut album Whatever People Say I Am, That's What I'm Not (2006).

== Geography ==
South Thoresby is about 1 mile (1.6 km) east from the A16 in the Lincolnshire Wolds. The civil parish extends much further to the south, over the A16 and to include the hamlets of Calceby (a former medieval village) and Driby, extending southwards to Langton by Spilsby. To the south-west is Haugh. It lies close to the northern boundary with Aby with Greenfield.

== Community ==
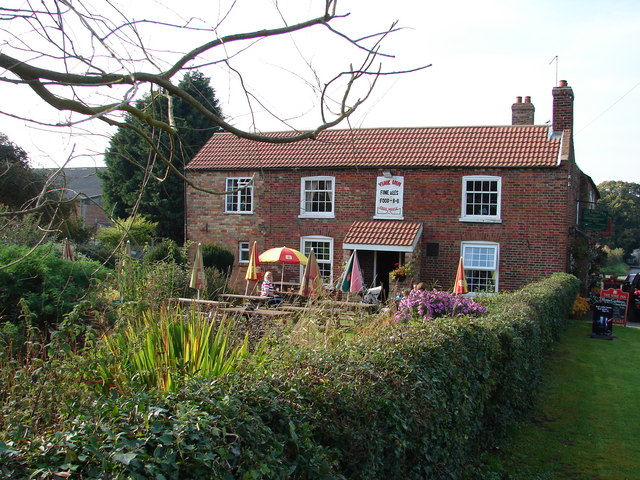
The Vine Inn, South Thoresby

The parish council administers Swaby, South Thoresby, and Haugh, although these are separate civil parishes.

South Thoresby church is dedicated to Saint Andrew, and dates from 1738. It was restored in 1872. It replaced an earlier church, which was abandoned by 1735.

The local public house is the Vine Inn, which was originally built in 1508. The present building appears to date from the 18th century.

Within the parish is Singleton Birch, a chalk quarry.

=== Nature reserve ===
The South Thoresby Warren nature reserve opened in 2007, and was officially declared a Local Nature Reserve in 2008. Birds seen there include the yellowhammer, bullfinches, great tits and buzzards. Plants there include the common spotted orchid, the Yorkshire fog, the common mouse-ear, the bristly ox-tongue, the silverweed, the self-heal and the common centaury.
