= Claythorpe =

Hamlet about 5 mi north-west from the town of Alford, Lincolnshire, England

Coordinates: 53.290807°N 0.119136°E

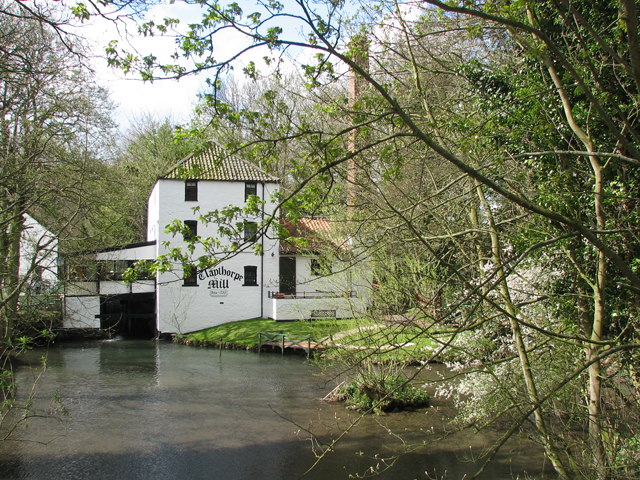
- Claythorpe Mill

- Location within Lincolnshire
- OS grid reference: TF413791
  - London: 125 mi (201 km) S
- District: East Lindsey
- Shire county: Lincolnshire
- Region: East Midlands
- Country: England
- Sovereign state: United Kingdom
- Post town: Alford
- Postcode district: LN13
- Police: Lincolnshire
- Fire: Lincolnshire
- Ambulance: East Midlands
- UK Parliament: Louth and Horncastle

Claythorpe is a hamlet about 5 miles (8 km) north-west from the town of Alford, Lincolnshire, England, most notable for its water mill. The population is now included in the civil parish of Authorpe.

Claythorpe Mill was for a time a restaurant but is now a visitor attraction with wildfowl gardens, animals and a cafe. It was known previously as Empire Mills when it was built as a corn mill in the 18th century. It was largely rebuilt in the 19th century, and the top floor was destroyed by fire and rebuilt again in 1890. Originally powered by a water wheel it has worked using a turbine since 1890, which is housed at the rear of the building. The steel wheel and gearing are still there, and it is a Grade II listed building. It was the last regularly working water mill in Lincolnshire, although it has not been in use since 1977.

Claythorpe Manor (formerly Claythorpe Hall) is a Grade II listed red brick farmhouse dating from the 18th century.
