= Authorpe =

Village and civil parish in the East Lindsey district of Lincolnshire, England

Coordinates: 53.307278°N 0.099033°E

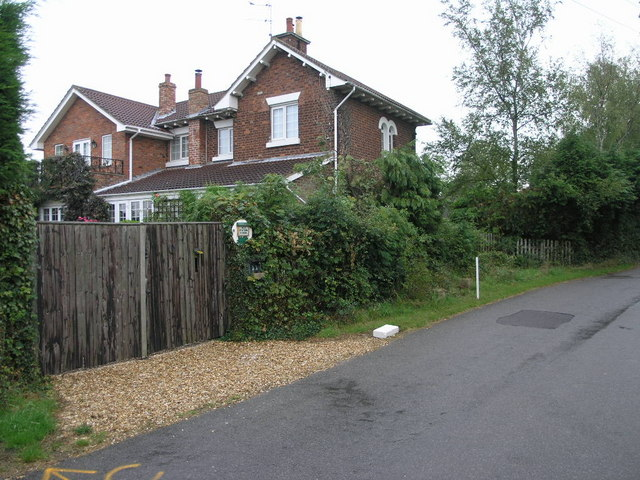
- The former Authorpe Station

- Location within Lincolnshire
- Population: 174 (including Belleau & Claythorpe. 2011)
- OS grid reference: TF399809
  - London: 120 mi (190 km) S
- District: East Lindsey
- Shire county: Lincolnshire
- Region: East Midlands
- Country: England
- Sovereign state: United Kingdom
- Post town: Louth
- Postcode district: LN11
- Police: Lincolnshire
- Fire: Lincolnshire
- Ambulance: East Midlands
- UK Parliament: Louth and Horncastle

Authorpe is a village and civil parish in the East Lindsey district of Lincolnshire, England. It is situated between the A16 and the A157 roads, 6 miles (10 km) south-east from Louth and 4.5 miles (7 km) north-west from Alford.

Authorpe is mentioned in the 1086 Domesday Book as "Agetorp", in the South Riding of Lindsey Hundred of Louthesk. Noted are 5 villagers, 1 smallholder and 4 freemen, with 3 ploughlands and 8 acres (0.03 km^{2}) of meadow. In 1066 Godric was Lord of the manor, by 1086 transferred to Ansgot of Burwell, who was also Tenant-in-chief.

The former church of Saint Margaret was built of greenstone, dated from the 15th century and was restored in 1848. It was declared redundant by the Diocese of Lincoln in July 1980, and demolished in 1982. Authorpe Hall Farm is a Grade II listed building built of red brick, dating from the 16th century with 18th-century additions, and 19th-century alterations.

Authorpe railway station served the village between 1848 and 1964. Authorpe Hedgehog Care Centre is in the village.
