= Farlesthorpe =

Hamlet in the East Lindsey district of Lincolnshire, England

Coordinates: 53.243430°N 0.211470°E

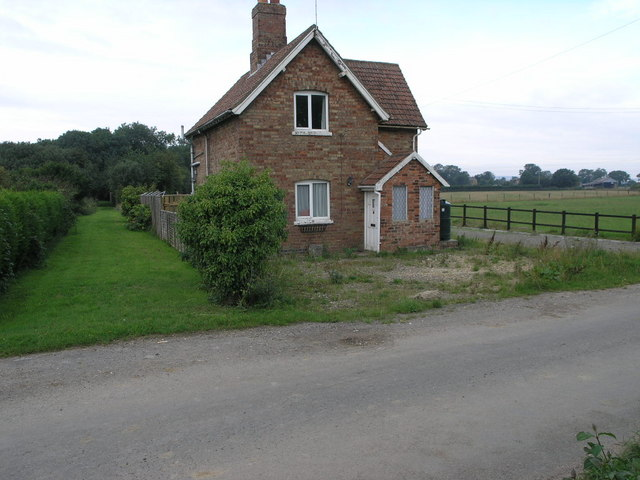
- Farlesthorpe Crossing House

- Location within Lincolnshire
- OS grid reference: TF476741
  - London: 120 mi (190 km) S
- Civil parish: Bilsby
- District: East Lindsey
- Shire county: Lincolnshire
- Region: East Midlands
- Country: England
- Sovereign state: United Kingdom
- Post town: Alford
- Postcode district: LN 13
- Police: Lincolnshire
- Fire: Lincolnshire
- Ambulance: East Midlands
- UK Parliament: Louth and Horncastle

Farlesthorpe is a hamlet in the East Lindsey district of Lincolnshire, England. It is situated approximately 2 miles (3 km) south-east from Alford, and about 7 miles (11 km) north-east from Spilsby. It is in the civil parish of Bilsby.

Dating from the 9th Century, Farlesthorpe was originally a Danish settlement. The origins of the name of Farlesthorpe are unknown but in the Domesday Book it is given as "Haroldestrop". It has also been spelt as Earlsthorpe and Faraldesthorpe.

The first church was built in the early 13th Century and dedicated to Saint Andrew. The present Grade II listed church was built in 1800, of brick and stone, and restored in 1881 and 1953. The small polygonal chancel with an apse and lancets was added in 1912. The altar slab is ancient, and there is a large stone font with a wooden lid.

The East Coast Main Line railway used to run through the village, and the disused trackbed is now part of a nature reserve.
