= Alford, Lincolnshire =

Town in East Lindsey district of Lincolnshire, England

Coordinates: 53.26°N 0.18°E

Alford
- Town and civil parish
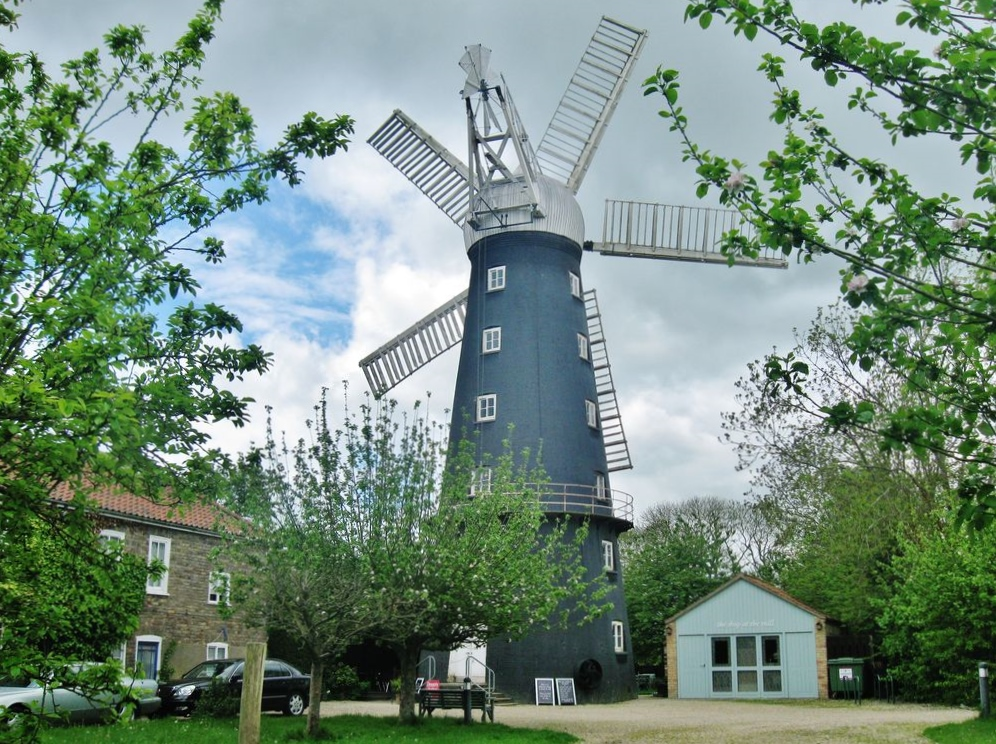
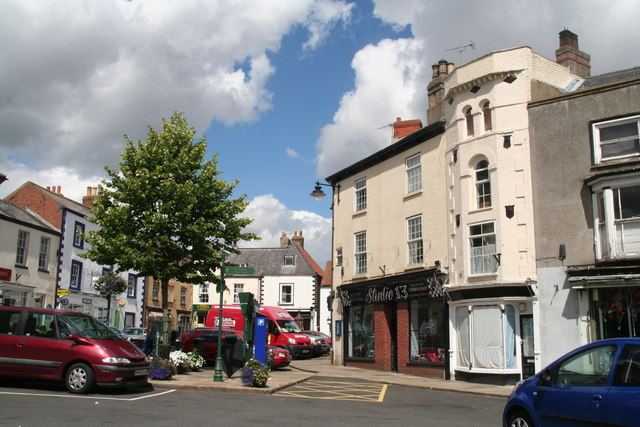
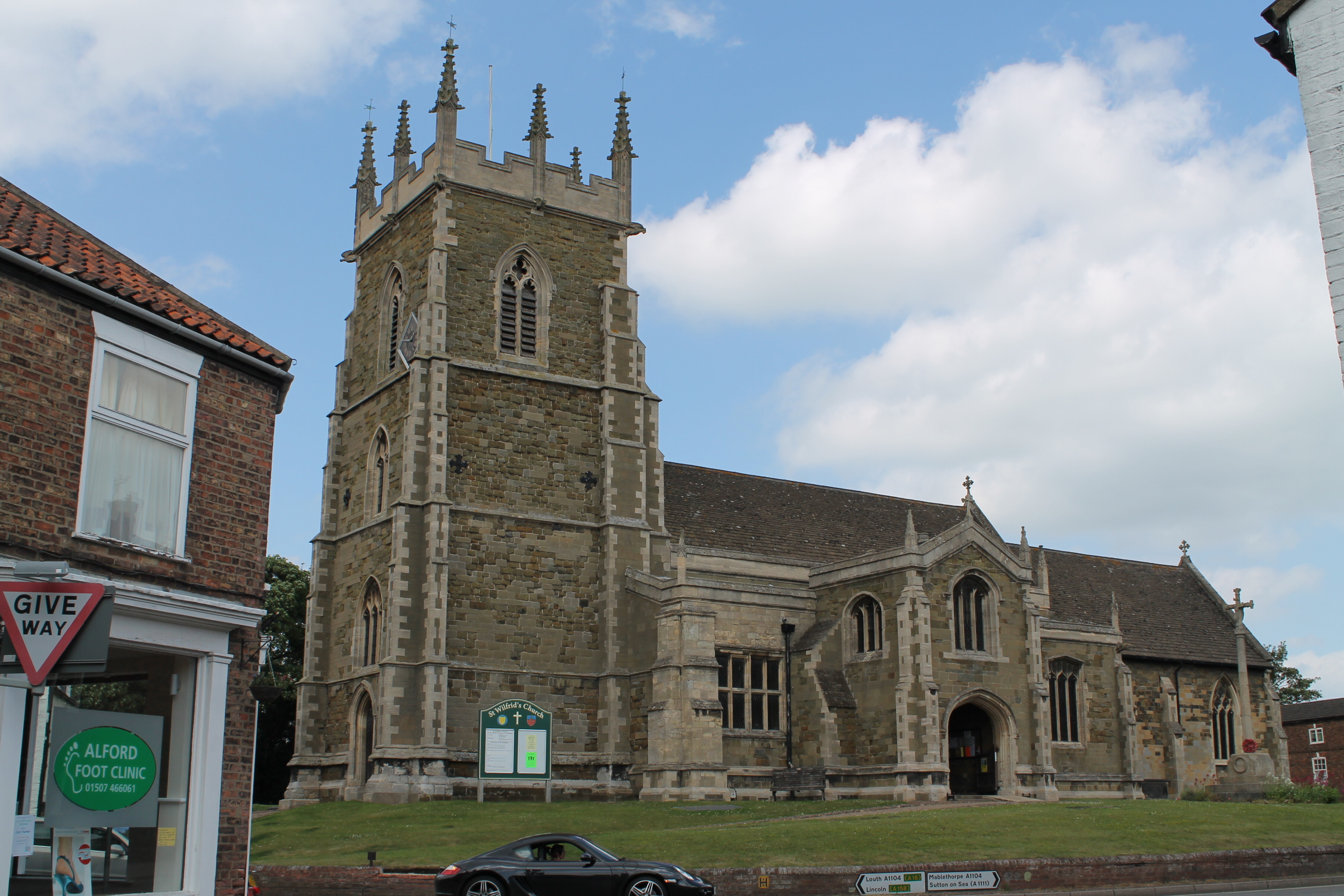
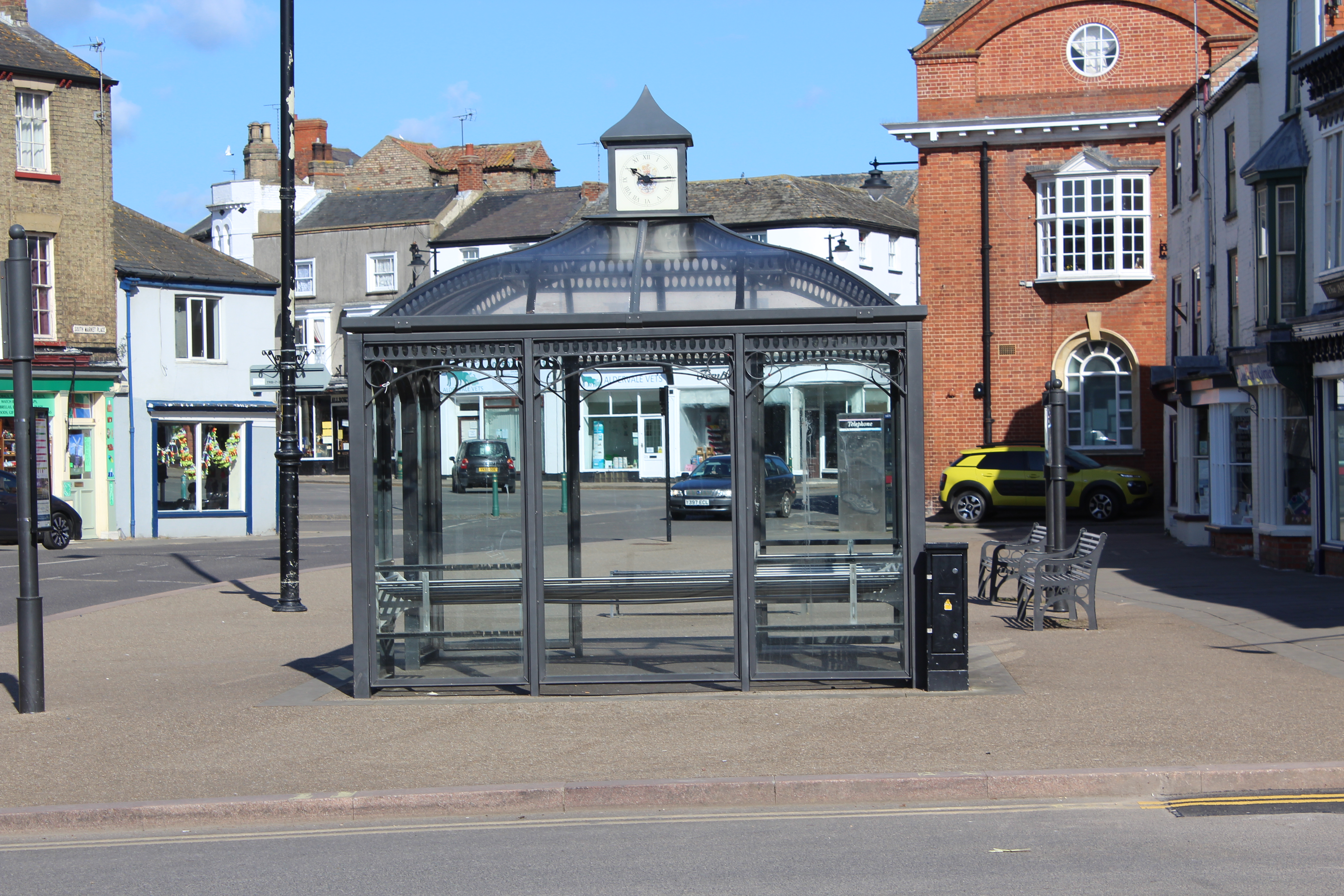
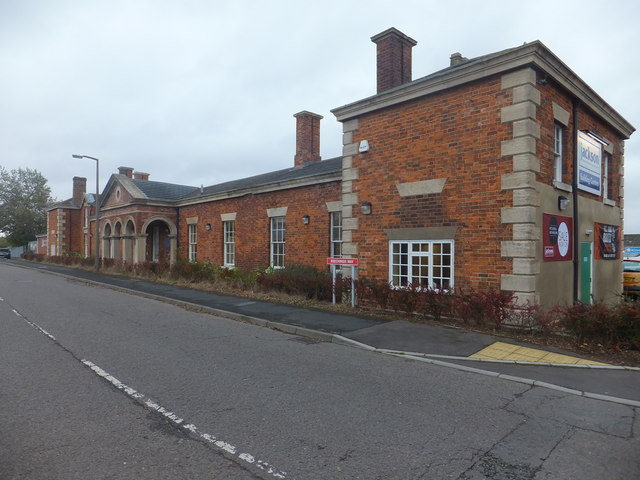
- Clockwise from top:Alford Windmill, St Wilfrid's Church, Old railway station, South Street and Market Place

- Location within Lincolnshire
- Population: 3,830 (2021)
- OS grid reference: TF454758
  - London: 120 mi (190 km) SSW
- Civil parish: Alford
- District: East Lindsey
- Shire county: Lincolnshire
- Region: East Midlands
- Country: England
- Sovereign state: United Kingdom
- Post town: ALFORD
- Postcode district: LN13
- Dialling code: 01507
- Police: Lincolnshire
- Fire: Lincolnshire
- Ambulance: East Midlands
- UK Parliament: Louth and Horncastle

Alford is a market town and civil parish in the East Lindsey district of Lincolnshire, England, at the foot of the Lincolnshire Wolds, which form an Area of Outstanding Natural Beauty. The population was recorded as 3,459 in the 2011 Census and estimated at 3,830 in 2021. It lies between the towns of Mablethorpe, Louth, Spilsby, and Skegness and acts as a local retail centre.

== History ==
Alford is mentioned in the Domesday Book as Alforde. There was a settlement at Alford in pre-Norman times and it provided a place to cross the beck. This is intimated in the 'ford' part of its name.

The name Alford derives from the Old English ald-ford meaning 'old ford'.

The town occupied an important position historically and a charter was obtained by William Well, lord of the manor of Alford, in 1283 for a market to be held on Tuesdays and two annual fairs – one at Whitsun and the other in November. These remained active until 1939 with the bull fair continuing until 1972. A cattle market was established in 1911 but closed in 1987.

In 1810 a purpose built theatre was being used by Joseph Smedley at a cost of seven Guineas.

The railway was opened in 1848 but was closed in 1970 with the demolition of the Grimsby to Boston line.

== Governance ==
An electoral ward of the same name exists. This stretches east to the coast, with a population of 4,531 recorded in the 2011 census.

== Amenities ==
Alford's retail outlets cater mainly for local demand. Shops include a pharmacy, a grocery, two butchers (the later one opened in November 2016) and DIY and hardware stores. There are three supermarkets, in Church Street, West Street and Hamilton Road. The five public houses are the Half Moon Hotel, Windmill Hotel, George, Anchor and White Hart. Four of these still operate as such – the Half Moon has a tea shop attached and is a venue for local activities. The Anchor has been renovated as a bed-and-breakfast establishment. The Windmill is now a hotel, while the White Hart is still a traditional pub.

The town has no banks, as the last, Lloyds Bank, closed in September 2018. There is still a Yorkshire Building Society office. Banking facilities are available at the Post Office, which operates in the Quicky Supermarket in West Street.

H & M Ducos Pottery, established in London in 1972, moved to Alford in 1973 and became the Alford Pottery. It acquired premises in Commercial Road in 1978 to manufacture tableware that is exported worldwide. The firm set up the Alford Craft Market, the Alford Festivals of arts and crafts, the Alford Folk Club (now an acoustic club), the Alford Morris Dancing club, the former Alford Jazz Festival, the former Alford Film Society, and other organisations. Alford Craft Market Centre is a cooperative venture selling works from local and regional craftsmen. With help from a substantial National Lottery grant, it provides various classes and workshops to allow the public to experience art and craft activities on a regular basis.

There are National Health private dentists in South Street and a doctor's surgery in West Street. A crematorium opened at the entrance to the town in 2008.

The charter market day is Tuesday. The main market is run by the town council in the marketplace, with stalls for groceries, greengroceries, fishmongers and other items, and an auction. The Alford Craft Market has been held in the Market Place every late Spring and August bank holiday since 1975, in the grounds of Alford Manor House. The summer weekly Craft Market now takes place in the Corn Exchange and the Christmas Extravaganza at the Manor House on the first Friday in December. The cattle market closed in 1987 and the site became the Co-op Car Park. In February 2019, the Alford Promotions group was set up by shop-owners and councillors to organize community events, including a Christmas Market, the first of which was held on 30 November 2019.

== Schools ==
Alford has three schools: one primary school and two secondary schools. They are located on different sides of Alford.

== Employment and transport ==
Most factories have closed in the last few years. The main sources of employment are newer businesses on the Safelincs industrial estate in West Street and the schools, nursing homes and smaller firms.

Beeching's Way Industrial Estate in the south-west of the town includes printing and manufacturing firms, a builders' merchant and a postal sorting office. It was built on the disused lines of the East Lincolnshire Railway from Grimsby to Boston, which closed on 5 October 1970, along with the local station. The naming of the industrial estate as Beeching's Way is a reminder of Richard Beeching, who masterminded the nationwide rail cutbacks under publicly owned British Railways at the behest of the Department of Transport.

There is a daytime Monday-to-Friday bus service to Skegness, a single Wednesday service to Boston, and occasional local and school bus services open to other passengers.

Alford also has bus connections to Mablethorpe and Spilsby, and one service a day to and from Louth. The nearest railway station is in Thorpe Culvert.

== Demography ==
Historical population

| Year | Pop. | ±% |
|---|---|---|
| 1881 | 2,894 | — |
| 1891 | 2,843 | −1.8% |
| 1901 | 2,478 | −12.8% |
| 1911 | 2,394 | −3.4% |
| 1921 | 2,194 | −8.4% |

| Year | Pop. | ±% |
|---|---|---|
| 1931 | 2,227 | +1.5% |
| 1951 | 2,218 | −0.4% |
| 1961 | 2,139 | −3.6% |
| 2001 | 3,231 | +51.1% |
| 2011 | 3,459 | +7.1% |

The population was recorded as 3,459 in the 2011 Census and estimated at 3,789 in 2019. Alford electoral ward recorded a population of 4,531 on the 2011 census.

== Landmarks ==
=== Windmill ===
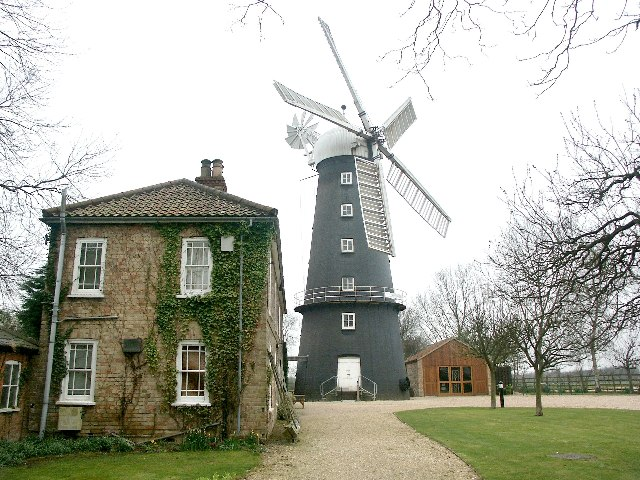
Windmill

Alford is known for its Grade I listed five-sailed windmill, a tower mill built in 1837 by Sam Oxley, an Alford millwright. In its heyday, it ground 4-5 tons of corn a day. It ceased to operate in 1955, but after two years' idle, it was restored to full working order in 1957 and is used commercially to produce stone-ground organic flour and cereal, as the only surviving windmill in the town of the three in 1932, each with a different number of sails (four, five and six). Other working windmills in the county remain at Lincoln, Heckington, Boston, Waltham, Kirton in Lindsey, Sibsey, Moulton, and Burgh le Marsh.

=== Manor House ===
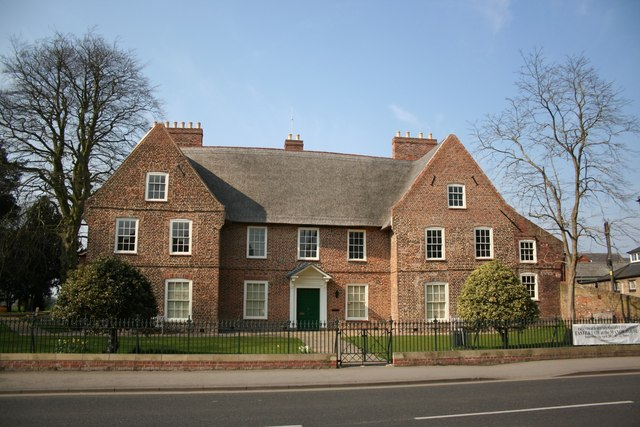
Alford Manor House

Alford Manor House is one of the country's largest thatched buildings of its kind. In 2006, it was refurbished with National Lottery funding through English Heritage. Interactive exhibits were installed and accessibility increased for disabled visitors. It has a tearoom and open gardens.

The Manor House has two permanent exhibitions. "Alford Remembers" has First World War memorabilia and a photography exhibition by Edwin Nainby, who was born in Gedney in January 1842 and died in Alford in July 1908. The youngest son of a Quaker, he was first in business as a photographer in Long Sutton and moved to Alford in 1873. There are over 750 glass photography plates exhibited. The annual events at the Manor House include a Christmas Tree exhibition, a tractor rally and a threshing day. There is a local museum at the back of the Manor House (Hackett's Barn), displaying the time when Alford thrived as a Victorian market town.

=== Corn Exchange ===
The Corn Exchange was given by East Lindsey District Council to a specially instituted body composed solely of volunteers, as a centre for cultural, social and community activities.

== Education ==
Alford has a primary school, one of England's few remaining grammar schools, Queen Elizabeth's Grammar School, founded in 1566, and John Spendluffe Technology College. The grammar school received a mixed Ofsted day-inspection report in 2007 and a "Good" school inspection in 2021. The technology college was gauged as "requiring improvement" at a full Ofsted inspection in March 2019 but received a "Good" school inspection in 2023.

== Media ==
Local news and television programmes are provided by BBC Yorkshire and Lincolnshire and ITV Yorkshire. Television signals are received from the Belmont TV transmitter.

Local radio stations are BBC Radio Lincolnshire, Greatest Hits Radio Lincolnshire and Hits Radio Lincolnshire.

The town is served by the local newspaper, LincolnshireWorld (formerly Alford Standard).

== Religious sites ==
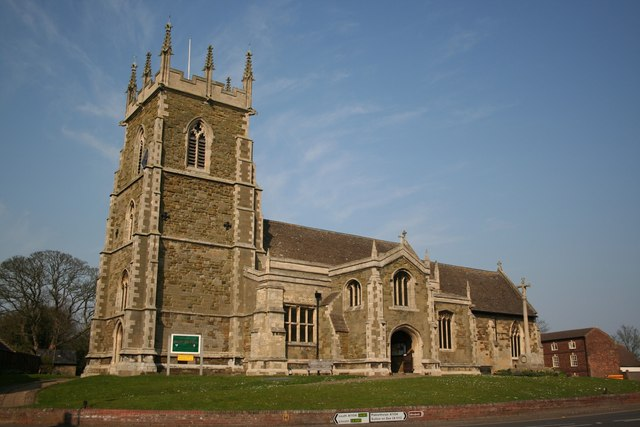
St Wilfrid's church

The Anglican Parish Church of Alford is dedicated to St Wilfrid, a 7th-century English bishop. Built in the 14th century, then restored with additions from 1860, it stands at the junction of Church, South and West streets. It includes St Lawrence's Chapel. The original features include a 14th-century screen, a Jacobean pulpit, traces of 16th-century glass and a 17th-century tomb in the chancel. The church founded a school in the Elizabethan period. Regular services and some annual community events such as a flower show are held. The war memorial in the churchyard commemorates local victims of the two world wars and in Northern Ireland.

Alford has a Methodist church, an Independent Congregational church, and Alford Christian Fellowship.

== Notable people ==
In order of birth:

- Captain John Smith (1580–1631) was an explorer of New England, whose name he coined, and was reputedly saved by the Native American "princess" Pocahontas. He lived in Great Carlton, 6 km (4 mi) to the north, and went to school in Alford.
- Anne Hutchinson, born Anne Marbury (1591–1643), Puritan settler and religious reformer in New England.
- Edward Hutchinson (1613–1675), Alford-born son of Anne Hutchinson, became prominent as a soldier and a politician in Rhode Island and Massachusetts.
- William Wentworth (1616–1697), born in Alford, was a follower of the Puritan John Wheelwright and an early settler in New Hampshire.
- Susanna Cole (1633–c. 1713), born in Alford, was captured and raised by American Indians after her family was massacred at New Netherland.
- William Charles Ellis (1780–1839), born in Alford, was a pioneer in the "humane treatment" of mental illness.
- Elizabeth Dawbarn (died 1839), born in Alford, was a Baptist religious pamphleteer.
- George Manville Fenn (1831–1909), novelist, taught in Alford.
- Bendix Hallenstein (1835-1905), shopkeeper, married here in 1861
- Enid Stamp-Taylor (1904–1946), film actress, is buried in Alford parish church.
- Tony Richardson (1943–2007), footballer born in Alford, played for Nottingham Forest, Cheltenham Town and Bradford City.

== Arms ==
Coat of arms of Alford, Lincolnshire

Notes
Originally granted to Alford Urban District Council on 1 October 1965. Transferred to successor parish on 16 April 1975.
Crest
On a wreath of the colours in front of a demi lion Ermine holding between the paws a book Or charged with a rose Gules charged with another Argent barbed and seeded Proper seven mascles conjoined Gules.
Escutcheon
Barry wavy Argent and Azure a lion rampant queue fourchee and on a chief Sable a windmill sail of five arms Or between two Lincoln Red Shorthorn Bulls' heads caboshed Proper ringed Argent.
Motto
Foursquare To All Winds

== See also ==
- Alford and Sutton Tramway
- Lincolnshire Poacher cheese
