= The Best of Thunder: Their Finest Hour (And a Bit) =

Compilation album by Thunder
- Released: 25 September 1995
- Recorded: 1989–1995
- Genre: Hard rock; heavy metal
- Length: 75:21
- Label: EMI
- Producer: Andy Taylor; Luke Morley; Mike Fraser

Thunder compilation album chronology
The Best of Thunder: Their Finest Hour (And a Bit) (1995)	Burrn! Presents: The Best of Thunder (1998)

Singles from The Best of Thunder: Their Finest Hour (And a Bit)
- 1. "In a Broken Dream" Released: 11 September 1995

The Best of Thunder: Their Finest Hour (And a Bit) is the first compilation album by English hard rock band Thunder. Released on 25 September 1995 by EMI Records, it features songs from the band's first three studio albums – Backstreet Symphony, Laughing on Judgement Day and Behind Closed Doors – as well as a re-recorded version of "Higher Ground", 1994 single "Gimme Shelter" and new tracks "In a Broken Dream" and "Once in a Lifetime".

Upon its release, Their Finest Hour (And a Bit) reached number 22 on the UK Albums Chart, number 3 on the UK Rock & Metal Albums Chart and number 47 on the Scottish Albums Chart. The album was certified silver by the British Phonographic Industry (BPI), indicating sales of 60,000 units. "In a Broken Dream" reached number 26 on the UK Singles Chart and number 28 on the Scottish Singles Chart, and topped the UK Rock & Metal Singles Chart.

== Background ==
On 11 September 1995, Thunder released a cover version of "In a Broken Dream", originally recorded by Python Lee Jackson with additional vocals from Rod Stewart, as a single. The song debuted at number 26 on the UK Singles Chart, number 28 on the Scottish Singles Chart, and number 1 on the UK Rock & Metal Singles Chart. Two weeks later, the band's first compilation album The Best of Thunder: Their Finest Hour (And a Bit) was released. The album features a selection of tracks from Thunder's first three studio albums – including five from 1990's Backstreet Symphony, four from Laughing on Judgement Day and three from 1995's Behind Closed Doors – as well as "In a Broken Dream", a re-recorded version of "Higher Ground" dubbed "Higher Ground '95", a recording of The Rolling Stones song "Gimme Shelter" (originally released on a various artists single of the same name), and the previously unreleased "Once in a Lifetime".

A greatest hits album was originally suggested to Thunder by EMI Records, their record label at the time, which the band's vocalist Danny Bowes interpreted as a sign that they were "about to get dropped" by the company. Recalling the situation in the group's 2016 biography Giving the Game Away: The Thunder Story, Bowes noted that "my first thought was 'That means we're off the label. They're trying to get the money in before they heave us out the door.'" The band recorded the new tracks "In a Broken Dream", "Higher Ground '95" and "Once in a Lifetime" at Wool Hall Studios in Beckington, Somerset.

== Release ==
The Best of Thunder: Their Finest Hour (And a Bit) was released in the UK and Europe by EMI Records on 25 September 1995. The album debuted at number 22 on the UK Albums Chart, number 3 on the UK Rock & Metal Albums Chart, and number 47 on the Scottish Albums Chart. It was also certified silver by the British Phonographic Industry, indicating sales in the UK of 60,000 units. The album was issued in Japan by Toshiba EMI on 29 November 1995. The album was also reissued in Japan in 2004, featuring the previously unreleased track "Sex Groove". Reviewing the album for AllMusic, Doug Odell described Their Finest Hour (And a Bit) as "a well-rounded collection for diehard fans or a perfect introduction for new ones". The compilation was promoted on its own short concert tour dubbed Their Finest Set (And a Bit), which visited five cities in England between 27 September and 2 October 1995.

== Track listing ==
No.	Title	Writer(s)	Length
1.	"Dirty Love"	Luke Morley	5:25
2.	"River of Pain"	Morley	3:37
3.	"Love Walked In"	Morley	6:22
4.	"Everybody Wants Her"	Morley; Gary "Harry" James; Danny Bowes; Ben Matthews	4:29
5.	"In a Broken Dream"	David Bentley	5:46
6.	"Higher Ground '95"	Morley	4:24
7.	"Backstreet Symphony"	Morley	4:30
8.	"A Better Man"	Morley	3:40
9.	"Gimme Shelter"	Mick Jagger; Keith Richards	5:25
10.	"Like a Satellite"	Morley	4:52
11.	"Low Life in High Places"	Morley	4:09
12.	"Stand Up"	Morley; James	4:00
13.	"Once in a Lifetime"	Morley	4:45
14.	"Gimme Some Lovin'"	Spencer Davis; Steve Winwood; Muff Winwood	3:49
15.	"Castles in the Sand"	Morley	4:36
16.	"She's So Fine"	Morley; Andy Taylor	5:32
Total length:			75:21

Japanese reissue bonus track
No.	Title	Length
17.	"Sex Groove"

Notes

- Tracks 1, 3, 7, 14 and 16 were originally released on Backstreet Symphony (1990)
- Tracks 2, 12 and 15 were originally released on Behind Closed Doors (1995)
- Tracks 4, 8, 10 and 11 were originally released on Laughing on Judgement Day (1992)
- Tracks 5, 6, 13 and 17 were previously unreleased
- Track 9 was originally released on Gimme Shelter Rock (1994)

== Personnel ==
- Danny Bowes – vocals
- Luke Morley – guitar, acoustic guitar, backing vocals (tracks 8 and 11), harmonica (track 8), production (tracks 2, 4, 8, 10–12 and 15)
- Ben Matthews – guitar, keyboards, piano, additional engineering
- Gary "Harry" James – drums, percussion
- Mark "Snake" Luckhurst – bass (tracks 1, 3, 4, 7, 8, 10, 11, 14 and 16)
- Mikael Höglund – bass (tracks 2, 5, 6, 9, 12, 13 and 15)
- International Singing Criminals – backing vocals (track 4)
- The Big Bad Horns – horns (track 4)
- Snake Davis – saxophone (track 4)
- Mo Hepple – backing vocal arrangements (track 4)
- Jody Linscott – percussion (track 10)
- Andy Taylor – production (tracks 1, 3, 4, 7, 8, 10, 11, 14 and 16)
- Mike Fraser – production and engineering (tracks 2, 12 and 15), mixing (tracks 1–3, 5–7, 9 and 12–16)
- Ken Lomas – engineering (tracks 4, 8, 10 and 11)
- David Bascombe – mixing (tracks 4, 8, 10 and 11)
- Ross Halfin – photography

== Bibliography ==
- McIver, Joel (11 November 2016), Giving the Game Away: The Thunder Story, London, England: Omnibus Press, ISBN 978-1785581373
