= Open the Window – Close the Door: Live in Japan =

Live album by Thunder
- Released: 5 September 2000
- Recorded: 12 – 19 March 2000
- Venue: Club Citta (Kawasaki, Japan)
- Genre: Hard rock; heavy metal
- Length: 72:02
- Label: Victor
- Producer: Luke Morley; Ben Matthews

Thunder live album chronology
They Think It's All Over... It Is Now (2000)	Open the Window – Close the Door: Live in Japan (2000)	They Think It's All Acoustic... It Is Now (2001)

Open the Window – Close the Door: Live in Japan is the fourth live album by English hard rock band Thunder. Recorded over four shows at Club Citta in Kawasaki, Japan in March 2000, during the final leg of the band's farewell tour prior to their initial breakup, it was produced by the band's two guitarists, Luke Morley and Ben Matthews. The album was released on 5 September 2000 by Victor Entertainment – the second Thunder live album exclusive to Japan.

Thunder announced in November 1999 that they were due to split up, following one last concert tour. The final leg of the tour took place in Japan, beginning on 8 March 2000 and ending eleven days later (a final UK show was later scheduled for May). Of the nine shows on the Japanese Farewell Tour, four took place at Club Citta in Kawasaki on 12, 13, 14 and 19 March. Recordings from these shows made up Open the Window – Close the Door: Live in Japan.

== Background ==
On 5 November 1999, Thunder released a statement which revealed that they had decided to break up. The announcement explained that "After a great deal of exploration, discussion and soul searching, we have decided to split up. The reasons are many and complex, but to cut a long story short, we feel we have no choice. We must stress that this decision is due to outside business forces and not down to any personal or musical differences within the band." Speaking later about the band's breakup, vocalist Danny Bowes explained that "I felt by late 1999 that we couldn't compete, and I was very fed up", adding that "Basically, I'd had enough". Both Bowes and guitarist Luke Morley expressed frustration with the band's frequent change of record labels, including their latest label Eagle Records.

Starting the following month, the band completed an official farewell tour, beginning with a run of UK shows wrapping up on 11 December at The Forum in London. The final full leg of the tour took place in Japan between 8 and 19 March 2000, with shows in Nagano, Nagoya, Shizuoka, Kawasaki and Osaka (these were followed only by one final show in the UK on 4 May, which was recorded and later released as They Think It's All Over... It Is Now and They Think It's All Acoustic... It Is Now). The tracks on Open the Window – Close the Door: Live in Japan were edited together from recordings taken across the four shows in Kawasaki and the album was released as a Japan exclusive on 5 September 2000. It was produced by guitarists Luke Morley and Ben Matthews, the latter of whom also mixed the record.

== Track listing ==
No.	Title	Writer(s)	Length
1.	"Welcome to the Party"	Luke Morley; Gary "Harry" James	5:12
2.	"Backstreet Symphony"	Morley	4:39
3.	"I'll Be Waiting"	Morley	4:24
4.	"Pilot of My Dreams"	Morley	4:50
5.	"In a Broken Dream"	David Bentley	5:27
6.	"River of Pain"	Morley	3:50
7.	"You Can't Live Your Life in a Day"	Morley	4:34
8.	"Fly on the Wall"	Morley	4:42
9.	"Play That Funky Music"	Rob Parissi	3:46
10.	"Just Another Suicide"	Morley; James	10:38
11.	"Love Walked In"	Morley	10:55
12.	"Dirty Love"	Morley	9:05
Total length:			72:02

== Personnel ==
- Danny Bowes – vocals
- Luke Morley – guitar, backing vocals, harmonica, production
- Ben Matthews – guitar, keyboards, backing vocals, production, mixing
- Chris Childs – bass, backing vocals
- Gary "Harry" James – drums, percussion, backing vocals, guitar
- Hiroshi Kawasaki – mastering

== Bibliography ==
- McIver, Joel (October 2016), Giving the Game Away: The Thunder Story, London, England: Omnibus Press (published 11 November 2016), ISBN 978-1785581373
