= They Think It's All Over... It Is Now =

Live album by Thunder
- Released: 10 July 2000
- Recorded: 4 May 2000
- Venue: Dingwalls (London, England)
- Genre: Hard rock; heavy metal
- Length: 107:05
- Label: Papillon
- Producer: Luke Morley; Ben Matthews

Thunder live album chronology
Live (1998)	They Think It's All Over... It Is Now (2000)	Open the Window – Close the Door: Live in Japan (2000)

They Think It's All Over... It Is Now is the third live album by English hard rock band Thunder. Recorded on 4 May 2000 at Dingwalls in London, the last date of the band's UK Farewell Tour, it was produced by the band's guitarists Luke Morley and Ben Matthews, both of whom also mixed it. The album was initially released on 10 July 2000 as the band's first release on Papillon Records. It was later issued in Europe by Repertoire Records on 27 November 2000.

Thunder announced in November 1999 that they were due to split up, following one last concert tour. The band's final show before disbanding took place on 4 May 2000 at Dingwalls in London, featuring an opening acoustic set followed by a regular "electric" set. They Think It's All Over... It Is Now features eleven of the fifteen electric songs and eight of the twelve acoustic songs. The album was the first release by Thunder following the band's breakup.

They Think It's All Over... It Is Now registered at number 108 on the UK Albums Chart and number 7 on the UK Rock & Metal Albums Chart. A second album recorded at the same show was released on 14 May 2001 – They Think It's All Acoustic... It Is Now features all but one of the recordings from the acoustic set (only the performance of "New York, New York" is excluded). Both albums were reissued in the UK by STC Recordings on 28 September 2005.

== Background ==
On 5 November 1999, Thunder released a statement which revealed that they had decided to break up. The announcement explained that "After a great deal of exploration, discussion and soul searching, we have decided to split up. The reasons are many and complex, but to cut a long story short, we feel we have no choice. We must stress that this decision is due to outside business forces and not down to any personal or musical differences within the band." Speaking later about the band's breakup, vocalist Danny Bowes explained that "I felt by late 1999 that we couldn't compete, and I was very fed up", adding that "Basically, I'd had enough". Both Bowes and guitarist Luke Morley expressed frustration with the band's frequent change of record labels, including their latest label Eagle Records.

Starting the following month, the band completed an official farewell tour, beginning with a run of UK shows wrapping up on 11 December at The Forum in London. A Japanese leg of the tour followed in March 2000, before the band played one final UK show at Dingwalls in London. The show featured two sets – one acoustic and one electric – both of which were filmed for an intended video release, however technical problems prevented the film from being made. Recalling the show in 2016, Bowes complained that "All kinds of bullshit went on. The sound was dreadful and we all hated it. It wasn't a great way to end, although we did record the audio and the audience was great, as usual."

They Think It's All Over... It Is Now was released on 10 July 2000 by Papillon Records as a limited edition numbered double CD set. It was released later in Europe by Repertoire Records, on 27 November 2000. The album debuted at number 108 on the UK Albums Chart and number 7 on the UK Rock & Metal Albums Chart. Another album recorded at the same show, They Think It's All Acoustic... It Is Now (featuring all but one song from the acoustic set), was released on 14 May 2001, and on 28 September 2005 both albums were reissued by STC Recordings.

== Track listing ==
Disc one: Electric set
No.	Title	Writer(s)	Length
1.	"Welcome to the Party"	Luke Morley; Gary "Harry" James	5:33
2.	"River of Pain"	Morley	3:58
3.	"Pilot of My Dreams"	Morley	4:54
4.	"Backstreet Symphony"	Morley	5:33
5.	"Until My Dying Day"	Morley; Andy Taylor	7:53
6.	"Fly on the Wall"	Morley	4:43
7.	"Love Walked In"	Morley	7:10
8.	"Just Another Suicide" (includes excerpt from "I Wish")	Morley; James	10:40
9.	"Gimme Shelter"	Mick Jagger; Keith Richards	5:54
10.	"Play That Funky Music"	Rob Parissi	3:55
11.	"Dirty Love"	Morley	9:58
Total length:			70:11

Disc two: Acoustic set
No.	Title	Writer(s)	Length
1.	"Stand Up"	Morley; James	4:17
2.	"Low Life in High Places"	Morley	6:12
3.	"This Forgotten Town"	Morley; James	4:42
4.	"Pinball Wizard" (The Who cover)	Pete Townshend	3:55
5.	"Once in a Lifetime"	Morley	6:39
6.	"Close to You" (The Carpenters cover)	Burt Bacharach; Hal David	3:13
7.	"Lola" (The Kinks cover)	Ray Davies	3:54
8.	"A Better Man"	Morley	4:02
Total length:			36:54

== Personnel ==
- Danny Bowes – vocals
- Luke Morley – guitar, backing vocals, harmonica, production, mixing
- Ben Matthews – guitar, keyboards, backing vocals, production, mixing
- Chris Childs – bass, backing vocals
- Gary "Harry" James – drums, percussion, backing vocals, guitar
- Tim Summerhayes – engineering

== Bibliography ==
- McIver, Joel (11 November 2016), Giving the Game Away: The Thunder Story, London, England: Omnibus Press, ISBN 978-1785581373
