= Willson Williams =

Studio album by Willson Williams
- Released: 26 April 2024
- Studios: Electric Studios, Leith
- Genres: Indie, folk
- Label: One Little Independent
- Producer: Rod Jones

Kathryn Williams chronology
Night Drives (2022)	Willson Williams (2024)	Mystery Park (2025)

Wilson Williams is a 2024 album collaboration by Kathryn Williams and Withered Hand with the release supported by Creative Scotland and recorded at Electric Studios, Leith, Scotland. Scottish artists King Creosote, Kris Drever and members of The Delgados, Belle & Sebastian, Arab Strap and Admiral Fallow contributed to the album.

'God Is In The TV' enthused about the record calling it 'beautifully musical and overall it is an album about friendship....like being given a warm hug' with Robert Christgau giving the album an A− rating and Tradfolk agreeing their collaboration is 'a tremendously life-affirming thing (that) envelops you in the warmest of embraces'

The album was shortlisted for Scottish Album of The Year

The album features a cover of Cat Stevens 'If You Want To Sing Out, Sing Out' from the 1971 film 'Harold & Maude'

== Track listing ==
1. Arrow
2. Grace
3. R U 4 Real
4. Our Best
5. Shelf
6. Wish
7. Sweetest Wine
8. Weekend
9. Sing Out
10. Elvis
11. Big Nothing

== Personnel ==
- Kathryn Williams – vocals, guitar & mellotron
- Withered Hand \ Dan Williams—guitar & vocals
- Louis Abbott—drums, percussion & backing vocals
- Graeme Smillie—Bass
- Chris 'Beans' Geddes—piano, synths, mellotron & organ
- Kris Drever—guitar
- Pete Harvey - - cello
- King Creosote—accordion & backing vocals
- Jacqueline Irvine—Mellotron & backing vocals
