= The Hand That Signed the Paper =

1994 novel and literary hoax

- Author: Helen Demidenko
- Language: English
- Genre: Fiction
- Publisher: Allen & Unwin
- Publication date: 1994
- Publication place: Australia
- Media type: Print
- Pages: 157
- ISBN: 978-1-86373-654-1
- OCLC: 1510153690

The Hand That Signed the Paper is a 1994 novel and literary hoax. It was written by Helen Darville, now Helen Dale, and was published under the name Helen Demidenko. The novel tells the story of a Ukrainian family that collaborated with Nazi Germany during the Holocaust. While the novel initially received a positive reception and was the 1995 winner of Australia's top literary prize, the Miles Franklin Award, it eventually became the subject of a heated debate—first over accusations of antisemitism, followed by the revelation that Darville had adopted a false identity to imply that the novel was based on her own family history.

The novel is narrated by Fiona Kovalenko, a university student of Irish-Ukrainian descent living in the Australian state of Queensland. Fiona's uncle Vitaly has been charged with crimes against humanity for his service as a guard at the Treblinka extermination camp. The novel recounts Vitaly and his siblings' upbringing in Ukraine amid the Holodomor, positing that perceived Jewish involvement in Bolshevism was a motive for Ukrainian participation in the Holocaust. The novel explores the moral responsibility of the Holocaust's perpetrators and suggests that it is unjust to prosecute Nazi collaborators like Fiona's father and uncle for actions taken during the war.

Helen Darville, the daughter of middle-class English parents, presented herself as a working-class Irish-Ukrainian woman named Helen Demidenko between 1992, when she began writing the novel, and her eventual exposure in 1995. Her unpublished manuscript was the winner of the 1993 The Australian/Vogel Literary Award and was published by Allen & Unwin in August 1994. The novel received a positive reception upon its release and was the winner of the 1995 Miles Franklin Award and Australian Literature Society Gold Medal. Shortly after the Miles Franklin Award announcement, however, the novel sparked controversy over accusations that it was overly sympathetic towards the perpetrators of the Holocaust. This backlash intensified in August 1995 when it was revealed that "Helen Demidenko" was a fabrication and that Darville had no familial connection to Ukraine.

The controversy surrounding the novel has been the subject of multiple books, including Andrew Riemer's The Demidenko Debate and Robert Manne's The Culture of Forgetting. Defenders of the novel have argued that it is a worthwhile experiment in postmodern fiction despite its imperfections, while critics have contended that it is an antisemitic work that distorts the history and moral lessons of the Holocaust.

== Plot summary ==
Fiona Kovalenko, the daughter of an Irish mother and Ukrainian father, is a university student in the Australian state of Queensland. Her uncle Vitaly immigrated to Australia from Ukraine in 1948 and has recently been charged with war crimes and crimes against humanity for his role in the Holocaust. Fiona fears that her father Evheny may soon also be charged. She describes finding photos in his bedside table at the age of 12 showing him and her uncle in SS uniforms participating in the massacre of Jews at Babi Yar and guarding prisoners at the Treblinka extermination camp.

Kateryna, the sister of Vitaly and Evheny, begins describing her upbringing in a village near Khmel'nik, Ukraine. She recounts the 1930s famine known as the Holodomor and the repression that Ukraine suffered under the Soviet Union. During the famine, the kommissar's wife, a Jewish doctor named Judit, refuses to treat Kateryna's youngest brother and likens Ukrainians to dogs. The famine eventually takes the lives of Kateryna's brother and all 12 of her cousins. Kateryna and Evheny are sent away to a Komsomol school, although Evheny soon runs away. At the school, Kateryna blames the famine on "communists and Jews" and is told by her fellow Ukrainian students that Adolf Hitler will help them to get revenge.

Following the German invasion of the Soviet Union, the village's residents begin to massacre communists. The German Army arrives in the village and is joyfully welcomed by its inhabitants, while Kateryna and her fellow students are evacuated to Kiev as German troops surround the city. On the journey, she develops a connection with a German SS captain named Wilhelm Hasse, with whom she enters into a relationship. Vitaly and Evheny join many of the other young men from their village in signing up to join the SS as auxiliary volunteers. In Kiev, Kateryna watches from a window as two uniformed men rape and kill a Jewish woman. She recognises one of the men as Evheny and waves to him. The next day, the Jews of Kiev are marched to the Babi Yar ravine and massacred using machine guns.

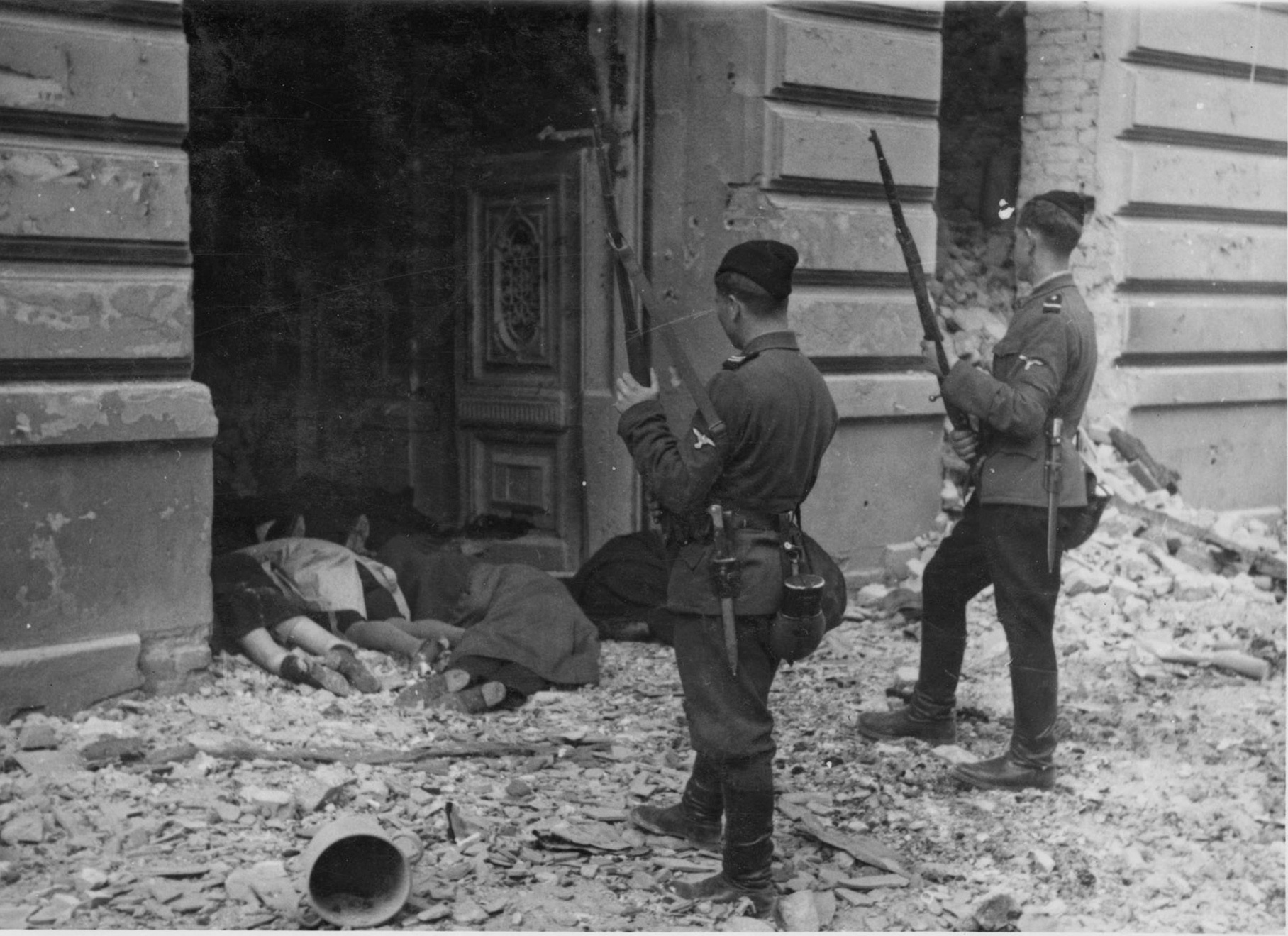
Ukrainian members of the SS standing in front of Jewish corpses in the Warsaw Ghetto

Vitaly is assigned to the Warsaw Ghetto and recalls bayonetting a Jewish baby hidden in a knapsack before shooting the father. He is later reassigned to Treblinka, where he is tasked with burning the corpses of those who have been killed in the gas chambers and participates in the looting of their belongings. He describes throwing infants into the air so that another guard, known as Ivan the Terrible, could catch them on a bayonet. A guard explains that Ivan is particularly brutal towards the prisoners because during the famine, Jews burned down his house while his parents and six siblings were trapped inside. Vitaly begins a relationship with a Polish girl named Magda and has a son named Ihor. Eventually, following a prisoner revolt, the Treblinka camp is shut down and Vitaly is sent to the front, leaving Magda and Ihor behind in Poland.

Evheny, serving with the 14th Waffen SS Galizien Division, surrenders to the British at Klagenfurt in 1945. He migrates to Britain with Kateryna, whose husband Hasse was killed in the Battle of Stalingrad, after they learn that their mother was killed in an industrial accident while working as a forced labourer in Germany. They assume that Vitaly is also dead and begin preparing to move to Canada, until they learn in 1949 that he has migrated to Australia and is working on the Snowy Mountains Scheme. Evheny, his Irish fiancée Margaret, Kateryna, and Kateryna's two children all move to Australia to join him.

In the present day, as Fiona works to help Vitaly prepare for his trial, he dies in hospital from a stroke. Fiona continues to protest the ongoing war crimes trials, but her father is ultimately not charged. Fiona visits Treblinka and meets a man whose Quaker aunt was killed at the camp. He asks her whether she is sorry for what her uncle did, and she says that she is.

== Background ==
Helen Darville grew up in the state Queensland as the daughter of two middle-class English migrants, Harry and Grace Darville. She attended Redeemer Lutheran College in Rochedale, a suburb of Brisbane. In 1989, Darville began her university studies at the University of Queensland, where she soon developed a reputation for eccentricity, often making fanciful claims about her background. She initially introduced herself as being of upper-class Belgian or Franco-Norman descent and said that she was a graduate of one of Brisbane's most prestigious private schools. She also claimed to be a prodigious mathematician and the daughter of a Czech resistance fighter. Eventually Darville settled on the story that she was the daughter of a working-class Irish mother and Ukrainian father.

In mid-1992, Darville began using the surname Demidenko-Darville, before eventually adopting the surname Demidenko. At around the same time, she began working on the manuscript for The Hand That Signed the Paper. The manuscript was written amid a nationwide debate over the trials of Nazi war criminals in South Australia. In 1988, the Australian government had passed the War Crimes Amendment Act to allow for the prosecution of the estimated 4000–5000 war criminals who had moved to Australia following the Second World War. The act was controversial, with many fearing that the legislation would result in costly and socially divisive trials of elderly residents. Three alleged war criminals, all of whom were Eastern European men in their seventies living in South Australia, were ultimately charged—Ivan Polyukhovich, Mikolay Berezowsky and Heinrich Wagner—of whom only the first was brought to trial. Polyukhovich was found not guilty on all charges.

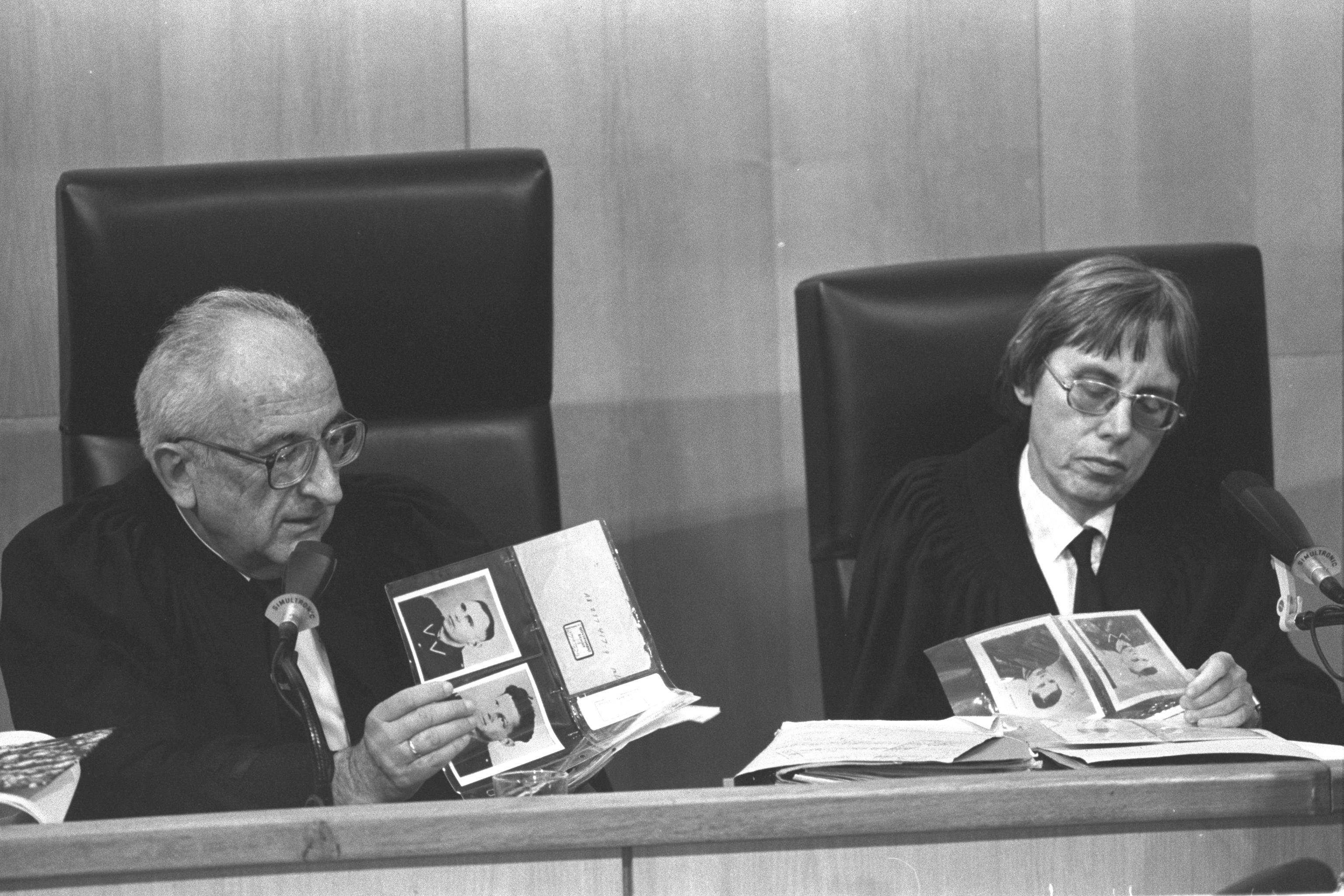
Judges reviewing evidence during John Demjanjuk's 1986 war crimes trial in Israel

Darville was a strong opponent of the trials, later explaining, "I was very upset by the war crimes trials, because I thought they were very specifically directed at the Ukrainian community and were very vindictive and sanctimonious ... it wasn't motivated by a sense of justice but by a sense of revenge". In 1988 Darville had written a short story in her high school magazine from the perspective of John Demjanjuk, who was believed at the time to be the Treblinka guard known as "Ivan the Terrible", during his war crimes trial in Israel. Her short story paints a sympathetic portrait of Demjanjuk as a victim of both Nazi Germany and the Israeli prosecution. Some of Darville's acquaintances later said that she had been expelled from her university's branch of the conservative Young Nationals after persistently sponsoring a motion opposing the war crimes legislation. During her time at the university, her politics became more left-wing; she eventually became a member of the Australian Democrats and advocated for environmentalism and LGBTQ rights.

== Development and publication ==
Darville's manuscript for The Hand That Signed the Paper was initially written as a work of non-fiction, with its characters sharing her adopted surname, and an author's note stating that the work was based on interviews with her uncle Vitaly Demidenko. Darville's boyfriend Paul Gadaloff later said that around this time Darville had developed a preoccupation with Jewish influence on society and with the Jewish Bolshevism conspiracy theory. He also said that Darville had described her book as a work of oral history, telling him that her uncle Vitaly lived in Adelaide and that he had been a guard at Treblinka. A friend of Darville, Natalie Jane Prior, later wrote that Darville had a tendency during this period to use "ugly, offensive and tiresome" language about "hook-nosed Jews and looney Zionists".

In early 1993, Darville submitted her manuscript for The Hand That Signed the Paper to the University of Queensland Press. The manuscript was rejected by the editor Sue Abbey, who wrote that she was unimpressed by what she deemed its flat characters and stilted dialogue. Later that year Darville submitted the manuscript under the name Helen Demidenko to the 1993 The Australian/Vogel Literary Award, an award for an unpublished manuscript by an author aged under 35 for which the winner is awarded a publishing contract with Allen & Unwin. According to Darville, she submitted her manuscript on a whim after her brother pointed out the application form printed on a newspaper page that she had placed underneath her dogs' bowls. Gadaloff later contradicted this account, saying that Darville had made "an assault on the Vogel from day one".

The judges of the 1993 Vogel award were the novelist Roger McDonald, the fiction writer Jennifer Rowe, and the broadcaster Jill Kitson. McDonald and Rowe did not initially see a clear favourite among the roughly sixty entries, whereas Kitson quickly became a strong advocate for The Hand That Signed the Paper. Rowe was comfortable with the selection, while McDonald was more sceptical of Darville's manuscript. He sent a short report to his fellow judges expressing his reservations, describing the novel as "bizarre, lurching, [and] erratic in focus" and suggesting that while it left a strong impression, it would require intensive editing. He also labelled Darville's portrayal of the Holocaust as "naive", and wrote that he feared that her historical framing would "be seen with justification as antisemitic". McDonald later recalled that these concerns had been brushed aside by Kitson and by Patrick Gallagher, the publisher at Allen & Unwin; he eventually acceded to the decision to award the Vogel to Darville.

The book was announced as the winner of the 1993 Vogel award on 22 September. Following the announcement, Darville—still presenting herself as Helen Demidenko—repeatedly told the media that her father had been born in Ukraine and that he had emigrated to Australia in the 1950s. She told journalists that she had been motivated to write the novel by the forthcoming war crimes trials. Representatives of her publisher, believing that the manuscript was at least in part autobiographical, were concerned that the book might put Darville's purported uncle in danger of prosecution and encouraged her to change her characters' names from "Demidenko" to "Kovalenko". Darville began to describe the novel as "part fact, part fiction" and said that it was based "on stories and situations she had heard about from family and friends while growing up"; she also removed all references to tape-recorded conversations with her uncle.

Having been awarded the right to a publishing contract, the manuscript was sent to Allen & Unwin for editing. The manuscript was first assigned to Stephanie Dowrick, who had edited the Vogel winners for several years. Dowrick declined to personally edit the work, later explaining that were it not the Vogel winner, she would have simply rejected it outright. According to Dowrick, Darville became angry after realising that Dowrick was unwilling to edit the manuscript and eventually said, "the Jews are not going to get away with this one". The manuscript was then sent to Brian Castro, who also declined to edit it and wrote, "I have no idea how this MS could have won ... I'm afraid I couldn't even finish reading it; not because of the propaganda and jingoism which abounds, and which is sometimes indistinguishable from the author's viewpoint; but because the prose is deadening and numbing."

Following Castro's refusal, the manuscript was sent to Lynne Segal, who also declined to edit it. She explained privately, "By the first ten manuscript pages I started getting an inkling of what this was about. After 30 pages, I decided that I could only copy edit it and let it damn itself. After 50 pages, I decided to no longer work on it, and wrote a report for the publisher stating my reasons." After receiving this brief report from Segal, Dowrick asked her to write a longer report detailing her concerns. Upon reading Segal's report, Gallagher commissioned a retired history professor, Geoffrey Jukes, to write his own report on the manuscript's historicity. Jukes made some factual corrections, but concluded that the novel was largely historically accurate.

The manuscript was then assigned to the editor Neil Thomas. Thomas later said that he had held some doubts about the novel's technical construction and that he had felt that it "teeter[ed] on the edge of apologetics". Despite these concerns, he was satisfied by Jukes' report and agreed to edit it. During the editing process, Darville was reluctant to make changes and expressed frustration to her acquaintances about the way she was being treated by the publisher, telling a friend that Segal and Dowrick had both been fired by Allen & Unwin after refusing to edit her manuscript. The novel was ultimately published in August 1994 with only minor changes from the Vogel-winning manuscript. Its back cover featured praise from the journalist David Marr and from Kitson, Darville's champion on the Vogel judging panel.

== Reception ==
=== Initial reviews ===
Ahead of the publication of The Hand That Signed the Paper, Darville and her publisher both braced for the potential that the novel might spark backlash. They feared that the book would attract furore both from members of the Ukrainian community angered by the portrayal of their countrymen as war criminals and from those in the Jewish community who would accuse the novel of providing an overly sympathetic portrayal of the Holocaust's perpetrators. Darville said in an August 1994 interview, "There's potential for a shitcan to be tipped over me with this book".

Despite these fears, the initial reviews were positive. In a review in The Canberra Times, Peter Pierce described the novel as among the best of the Vogel award's winners. In The Courier-Mail, Frank O'Shea called the novel a "fascinating and courageous" work. The novel was named one of the best books of 1994 by Margaret Jones in The Sydney Morning Herald, where she wrote that the novel was a particularly impressive achievement for such a young debut author.

Reviewers reserved particular praise for what they described as the book's detached, unemotional tone. Reviewing the book in The Age, the literary critic Andrew Riemer described the book as employing "precise, dispassionate prose" and wrote that Darville's aim of showing how ordinary people could commit horrific acts was both entirely legitimate and executed with great skill. In The Sydney Morning Herald, Miriam Cosic praised the prose as "unflinching", describing the novel as a "dense, horrifying" work.

Some early reviewers commented on the novel's historical framing. In a review published in Australian Book Review, Cathrine Harboe-Ree praised the work as a "fine novel", but wrote that it contained a "rather superficial view of Jews". In The Sun-Herald, Susan Geason wrote a more sceptical review, praising the novel as an impressive debut while criticising the author's failure to properly explain her characters' motivations for collaborating with the Nazis. Riemer, despite his otherwise positive assessment, suggested that the novel's failure to explicitly condemn its characters would likely disturb some readers. Concerns from the Jewish community, however, were generally muted. Darville received a largely positive feature in The Australian Jewish News following the book's release, which concluded that she had written the book in service of the honourable cause of addressing prejudice.

Following the novel's publication, Darville continued to present herself as being of Ukrainian descent. She wore Ukrainian clothing in many of her public appearances, signed books in Ukrainian, and performed a Ukrainian folk dance at one event. In a speech at the Sydney Writers' Festival in January 1995, Darville told the audience that she had grown up in commission housing and had won a scholarship to a private school, where she had graduated at the top of her class. Darville said that her Ukrainian father Markov was a taxi driver and that her Irish mother was a domestic worker. She told one interviewer that winning the Vogel award allowed her father to take his first plane trip, and that it was the first book her mother had read after leaving school at the age of 12.

=== Miles Franklin Award ===
In 1995 The Hand That Signed the Paper was shortlisted for the Miles Franklin Award, widely regarded as Australia's most prestigious literary award. The judging panel included Kitson—who had championed the novel on the Vogel judging panel—alongside the Chancellor of the University of Sydney, Leonie Kramer, the head of the State Library of New South Wales, Alison Crook, and the English professors Harry Heseltine and Adrian Mitchell. On 1 June, The Hand That Signed the Paper was announced as the winning novel. In their report, the judging panel wrote that the novel "brings to light a hitherto unspeakable aspect of the Australian migrant experience" and displays "a powerful literary imagination coupled to a strong sense of history". While the decision was not announced until July, The Hand That Signed the Paper had also been selected on 17 April as the winner of the 1995 Australian Literature Society Gold Medal.

Riemer later wrote that the announcement that the novel had won the Miles Franklin Award was met with "a mixture of disbelief and sardonic amusement" in literary circles. In his view, the novel was generally regarded as an "immature though compelling first novel" that was deserving of the Vogel award—a prize designated for emerging writers—but not the Miles Franklin. While some speculated that the judging panel's decision was attributable to what they viewed as a growing fetishisation of "multicultural chic" in Australian literature, both Riemer and the political scientist Robert Manne were sceptical of this hypothesis, noting that the judging panel featured several members known for their literary conservatism. Manne concluded in his 1996 book on the controversy that very little was known about the reasons for the judging panel's decision.

=== Accusations of antisemitism ===
The eventual backlash towards Darville's novel was sparked on 9 June 1995 by the publication of a column in The Age by Pamela Bone. The column was highly critical of the novel; Bone highlighted the statement that it was "a book of extraordinary redemptive power" and questioned the morality of attempting to redeem the Holocaust's perpetrators. She also critiqued the novel's historical framing, arguing that Jews had been persecuted in eastern Europe for hundreds of years prior to the Holocaust and that it was ahistorical to blame Jewish involvement in the Ukrainian famine for Ukrainian collaboration with the Nazis.

On 17 June, Judith Armstrong, a professor of Russian Studies at the University of Melbourne, responded with a column defending the novel. Others soon joined the debate in The Age. The historian Stephen G. Wheatcroft wrote in a column on 21 June that the novel contained serious historical errors and criticised Armstrong for lending credibility to the work. He argued that the novel presented a similar conclusion to the contemporary far-right narrative that Jews were in part collectively responsible for Eastern Europe's suffering under the Soviet Union. Jacques Adler, a historian and former member of the French resistance whose family had been killed at Auschwitz, wrote on 22 June that the work was "so far from the historical truth that the book serves as an apologia for genocide".

On 27 June, Darville wrote in both The Age and The Sydney Morning Herald to defend her book, saying that the criticism "bordered on the hysterical". She defended her historical interpretation, writing that, "Individual Ukrainians, albeit in quite large numbers, collaborated with the Germans. Individual Jews, albeit in quite large numbers, collaborated with Bolshevism". She also highlighted her supposed direct knowledge of this history, saying that most of her father's family had been "killed by Jewish Communist Party officials in Vynnytsa". Darville, falsely describing herself as a lawyer, explained that it was her legal training and courtroom experience that had compelled her to "search for a motive" for Ukrainian participation in the Holocaust. Darville's defence of her novel appeared alongside a critique from the author Gerard Henderson, in which he labelled the novel a "loathsome" book. That evening, a debate between Darville and Henderson was broadcast on ABC television. An article published that day noted that the growing controversy appeared to be having a positive effect on sales; Allen & Unwin had ordered two reprints, and there were over 3000 back orders. By 11 July, it was reported that the novel had sold more than 10,000 copies and was ninth on the Angus & Robertson bestseller list.

On 29 June, the Harvard Law School professor Alan Dershowitz published an op-ed in both The Age and the Australian Financial Review calling the novel "pernicious" and "mean-spirited". Dershowitz argued that Darville's goal had been to use the novel in furtherance of her opposition to the war crimes trials by justifying Ukrainian participation in the Holocaust in order to ensure that war criminals would go unpunished. The antisemitism scholar Robert S. Wistrich weighed into the debate and described the novel's thesis about the Holocaust's origins as "more dangerous than any form of Holocaust revisionism".

While criticism of the novel continued to mount, others defended the novel and cast its critics as censorious. An editorial in The Sydney Morning Herald criticised proponents of "PC fiction". Marr defended the novel, comparing the "terrible smears and vilification" to the Satanic Verses controversy. The author and literary critic Gerard Windsor wrote in Australian Book Review that the criticism was a "well-funded witch hunt" filled with "righteous high-mindedness and tribal indignation", while the critic Morag Fraser said that the novel deserved a more tolerant debate. Others blamed the Jewish community for the backlash; the conservative columnist Frank Devine described the criticism as an organised campaign by Jewish organisations, comparing it to the radical feminist campaign against The First Stone.

=== Darville's identity revealed ===
On 19 August 1995, the journalist David Bentley wrote in The Courier Mail that Helen Demidenko was actually Helen Darville, the daughter of English migrants, and had no Ukrainian ancestry. Bentley had become suspicious of her identity after noticing that Darville had a tendency to provide vague answers when asked about her education, and was informed of her true identity by her high school principal. Bentley was eventually awarded the 1995 Gold Walkley, Australia's top journalism award, for the story.

At first, many of Darville's defenders refused to believe Bentley's claims. On 21 August, however, members of Darville's family publicly confirmed the story, with her brother telling the media that her claims of Ukrainian ancestry had been "a great marketing exercise". Darville released a statement saying that she had begun to use the name "Demidenko-Darville" at university and that Demidenko was the name of her paternal extended family. It was soon reported that Darville had described herself as French and Czech while at university, and that she had committed plagiarism in her university's student newspaper in 1990. On 25 August, a statement with the headline "Helen Darville apologises" was published in newspapers around the country. Darville admitted that her Demidenko identity was a fabrication and wrote "I am truly sorry if my book or my actions have been perceived in any way as antisemitic or degrading to the Ukrainian community ... I condemn without reservation the perpetrators of the Holocaust".

Following the revelation, criticism mounted towards those who had defended her novel. Helen Daniel, the editor of Australian Book Review, and Louise Adler, the arts editor of The Age, argued that the judging panel that had awarded Darville the Miles Franklin Award should resign, while the literary academic Ivor Indyk said that Darville's ALS Gold Medal should be revoked. The episode was described in The Age as "perhaps the most shameful literary deception of recent times". Much of this criticism was directed towards Kitson, who had served on both the Vogel and Miles Franklin judging panels and had been one of the novel's strongest defenders. The historian William Rubinstein wrote that Darville had falsified her identity in order to give support to "an antisemitic lie of the most despicable kind", and that the fact that the judging panel had retained their positions was a "sad indictment of Australia's utter provinciality and marginality".

Critics argued that Darville's claims of Ukrainian ancestry had been used to lend credibility to her work. Henderson argued in The Sydney Morning Herald that Darville had received a positive reception because she suggested that her book was drawn from oral history, and that without that excuse, its similarities to propaganda about Judeo-Bolshevism became more glaring. Bone wrote that she felt some sympathy for Darville, and that most of the blame for the saga should fall on the Miles Franklin judges. Bone expressed her astonishment that the judges had found what she described as "a catalogue of atrocities interspersed with some laughably stilted dialogue and some clumsy sex scenes" the best novel of the year.

Others continued to defend Darville. Devine wrote that the criticism amounted to "miserable, philistine treatment of a young writer of talent". Kramer, who had served on the Miles Franklin judging panel, wrote that she was puzzled by the "sustained and vitriolic attack on the book and its author", and said that the episode "calls into question our claims to be a tolerant and fairminded society". The philosopher Peter Singer defended the novel, writing that it was not an antisemitic work and attributing the controversy to the media's tendency to reduce everything to a "kind of sporting contest". He said that in his view the novel attempted to explain, rather than justify or minimise, the actions of the Holocaust's perpetrators. The new wave of controversy only added to the novel's sales; by 23 August, it was reported that the novel had sold about 25,000 copies. It topped all but one of the Weekend Australian's biweekly bestseller lists between 1 July and 7 October.

=== Plagiarism accusations ===
On 26 August, it was reported in the Herald Sun that Darville had plagiarised a passage from the novel The Power and the Glory. The Sydney Morning Herald reported five days later that Darville had plagiarised additional passages from Thomas Keneally's novel Gossip from the Forest, Robin Morgan's The Demon Lover, and a Ukrainian collection called The Black Deeds of the Kremlin. The night before, Allen & Unwin had halted distribution of the book over the concerns. Additional claims of plagiarism in The Hand That Signed the Paper continued to be reported over the following month.

On 7 September, Darville's lawyers at MinterEllison announced that they believed the plagiarism allegations to be false. The lawyers said that they had consulted an expert on postmodern literature, who had told them that Darville's copying from other sources was a normal element of postmodern writing. The lawyers for Allen & Unwin concurred. On 8 September, Allen & Unwin announced that they were "satisfied that allegations of plagiarism cannot be justified" and distribution of the novel was resumed. Allen & Unwin eventually released a new edition of the book under the name Helen Darville, with the sources copied by Darville acknowledged and the praise from Marr and Kitson removed from the book's back cover.

Commentators were divided on whether the novel contained plagiarism. Indyk said that the work contained plagiarism that "attacks [its] very foundations", while the author Thomas Shapcott said that what had occurred was appropriation rather than plagiarism. Manne described it as "concealed, pervasive and clumsy plagiarism", although he said that it did not rise to the level of a breach of copyright law. The literary academic Judith Ryan described Darville's copying as "flagrant", but said that it did not constitute plagiarism in a legal sense.

=== Later reception ===
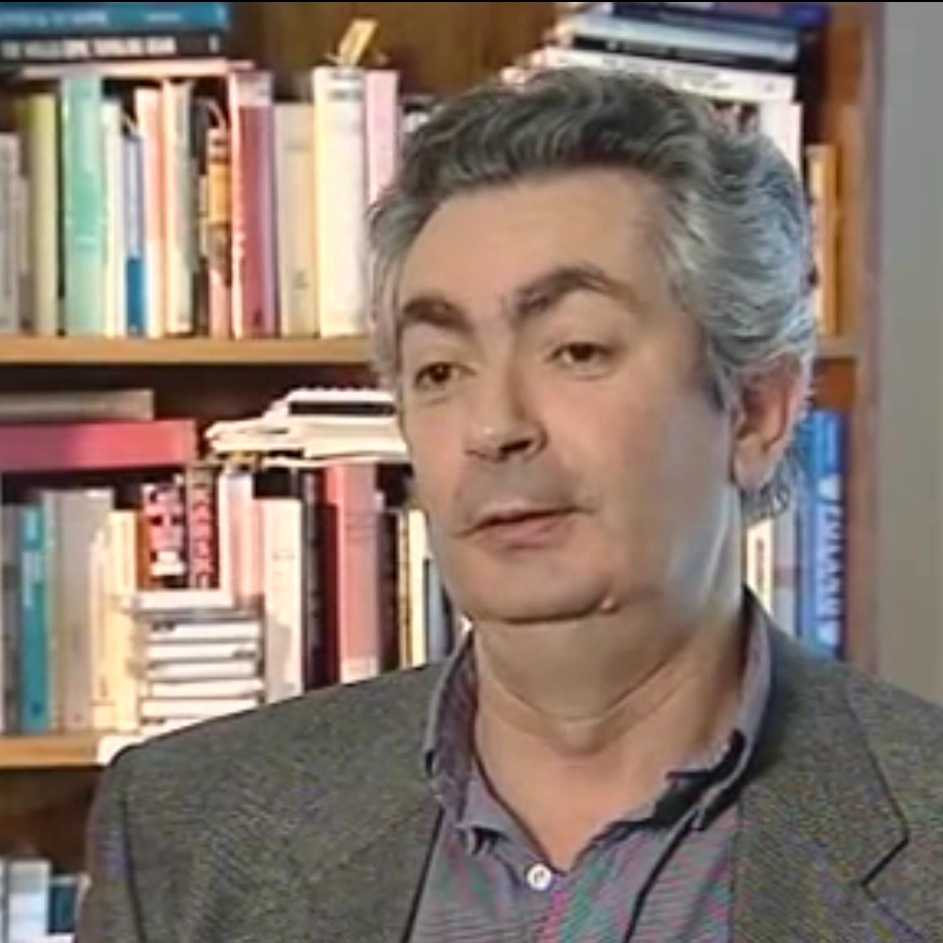
Robert Manne, who emerged as one of the novel's most vocal critics

By February 1996, three books on the controversy had been released: an anthology of newspaper articles and television and radio transcripts titled The Demidenko File; a tell-all book by Darville's friend Natalie Jane Prior titled The Demidenko Diary; and a book by Riemer titled The Demidenko Debate. In June, Manne's The Culture of Forgetting: Helen Demidenko and the Holocaust was published.

Manne was highly critical of the novel, writing, "I found the book laughably inadequate to its subject and unmistakably antisemitic ... I found it morally and historically shallow, coarse and cold, even technically quite incompetent". Manne argued that no "civilised" European publisher or literary judging panel would have considered the novel, and that the saga demonstrated the Australian literary establishment's "provincial liberal naivety, historical ignorance and sentimental multiculturalism". Riemer gave a more sympathetic assessment in The Demidenko Debate. He admitted that he was troubled by parts of the novel's subtext, but that he had felt upon his initial reading that the novel was "antisemitic in a limited and on the whole tolerable sense". Riemer defended the novel as a work of fiction and wrote that critics' blurring of the boundaries between fiction and discursive writing led to "many passionate but often ill-founded expressions of outrage". In a 1997 paper contrasting the reactions of Manne and Riemer, the cultural studies scholar McKenzie Wark wrote that Riemer had used the novel to defend an liberal view of tolerance and to criticise simplistic narratives of good and evil.

Riemer and other defenders of the novel suggested that much of the fervour had been driven by the Jewish community. He noted that the controversy was strongest in Melbourne, where the Jewish community is more tight-knit and Orthodox than in Sydney. In January 1996, a cartoon published in The Australian had shown Darville impaled on a hanukkiah. Others, however, disputed this claim. Manne said that the Australian Jewish press was not particularly critical of the novel until after the backlash had already erupted in mainstream newspapers, and that Jewish organisations had played a minimal role in the controversy. The journalist Michael Gawenda concurred, pointing out that many of the book's fiercest critics were not Jewish, while some of the book's strongest defenders, including Riemer and Singer, were. Critics of the novel also contested Riemer's suggestion that Darville's opponents had attempted to censor her, saying that there was no evidence that meaningful threats of legal action against the book were ever made.

== Themes ==
The Hand That Signed the Paper explores the motivations of Ukrainians for collaborating with the Nazis, suggesting that many participated in the Holocaust as retribution for the hardships they felt that they had suffered at the hands of Jews under Soviet rule. Fiona says in the novel that "the Ukrainian famine bled into the Holocaust and one fed the other". In the pre-war years, Jews are shown to be responsible for many of the Kovalenko family's sufferings, including the deaths of Vitaly's father and infant brother. The novel goes on to depict the lives of the Ukrainian guards at Treblinka as they exact their revenge on those they view as responsible for this suffering.

Riemer argues that the novel investigates the causes of human behaviour with the aim of presenting a plausible motive for its characters' participation in the Holocaust. In his view, the novel serves to illustrate how atrocities can emerge from ordinary human fears, emotions, and prejudices, with revenge and injustice serving as recurring motifs that make the otherwise inexplicable actions of the Ukrainian characters plausible. To the cultural studies scholar McKenzie Wark, this exploration of the motives of the Holocaust's perpetrators "opens a crack in the grand fables of the early 20th century and lets a little late 20th century scepticism in" by depicting the perpetrators as flawed humans rather than accepting the narrative of their absolute evil. Harboe-Ree writes that the narrative can be understood to be presenting the case for the defendants in the trials of Nazi war criminals by arguing that collaborators like Evheny and Vitaly did commit the crimes of which they were accused, but only due to the provocations they had endured.

Commentators held differing interpretations of the novel's portrayal of its Ukrainian characters. Riemer argues that the novel uses the contrast between its Ukrainian characters' actions and their lack of adequate comprehension or remorse to illustrate that their accounts are unreliable. Peter Singer agrees, saying that the novel represents an attempt to explain rather than justify evil. In Riemer's view, the novel's use of postmodern literary techniques provides it with limited means of conveying an explicit moral stance to its readers, resulting in somewhat clumsy attempts to express moral judgement within the constraints of the genre. To Sue Vice, a scholar of Holocaust fiction, these omissions leave space for the reader to insert their own knowledge of history and question the characters' explanations of their actions, turning the novel's gaps into "sites of irony" once the reader recognises that the narrators' accounts are at times distorted and self-serving. Others argue that the narrative's focus on the humanity of Ukrainian collaborators shifts the reader's sympathy away from the Holocaust's victims. Manne writes that the novel suggests that it is unjust to bring the Holocaust's perpetrators to trial, while the academic Peter Christoff argues that the novel presents Ukrainian Nazi collaborators as "passive, coerced innocents" who cannot fairly be held responsible for their actions.

The novel's historical framing has also been the subject of debate. In explaining her motivations for writing the novel, Darville said that she hoped to place the Holocaust within its broader context as part of a longer history of prejudice and revenge. This, to Manne, represents a form of "cultural or moral revisionism" that results in the stripping away of the Holocaust's "ultimate inexplicability". Riemer argues that Darville's novel was offensive to many of its critics because it suggested that the Holocaust could be understood on the same human terms as other atrocities, rather than as an event of unique and inexplicable evil, describing this criticism as "essentially theological" in nature. Riemer argues that many critics of the novel also incorrectly attributed the attitudes of its characters—for instance, its characters' belief that Jews had been responsible for the Ukrainian famine—to the novel's author, rather than reading them as reflections of the views of Ukrainians at the time. Ryan writes that while it is true that these views may be attributable to the novel's various narrators rather than its author, the novel's lack of an authoritative moral voice allows distorted views of history to go unquestioned within the text.

== Style ==
The Hand That Signed the Paper is widely regarded as an example of postmodern literature. Commentary on the novel's style has described it as lacking a strong authorial voice and as employing detached and unemotional prose. To Vice, the novel's tone lends a sense of ordinariness to its depiction of how individuals came to participate in atrocities. Riemer writes that the novel's detached prose and the lack of an authoritative voice interpreting the discordant accounts of its various narrators exemplify the tendency towards scepticism and irony that he regards as characteristic of late-20th century literature. Judith Ryan argues that anachronisms within both Darville's novel and her performance as Helen Demidenko, such as the occasional appearance of modern cultural references that are incongruous with the historical setting, seem in part intentional. She believes that these anachronisms reveal that Darville was in fact attempting a deliberate pastiche of postmodernism; she concludes that the work was a thought-provoking exploration of the genre, but that it ultimately failed to mount a coherent critique of postmodernism.

The significance of the authorial voice in The Hand That Signed the Paper has been widely debated. Vice writes that the novel is constructed "idiosyncratically" through a combination of first-person accounts from Fiona, Kateryna and Vitaly, and an implied third-person narration. This was viewed by some readers as a technical flaw in the novel's construction. The identity of the implied third-person narrator has been subject to multiple interpretations; some readers regarded the third-person voice as being that of Fiona, while others believed that it represented the voice of the author. In 2000, Vice defended the novel by arguing that it was an example of polyphony, or a dialogue between voices in which the narrator does not have an omniscient perspective. Vice concluded that the novel showed how polyphony and dialogized heteroglossia—the interplay between multiple voices within a single text—could be used to craft powerful fiction about the Holocaust. In 2007, however, Vice wrote that she was no longer convinced that the novel was an example of true polyphony, and that multivocality was instead used to mask what she saw as the novel's undemocratic agenda. She added that the novel had a tendency towards "sexualising and glamorising" the Holocaust's perpetrators by including repeated descriptions of their physical attractiveness and romantic and sexual relationships.

== Analysis ==
The novel and its reception have been examined as a case study in Australian multiculturalism. The literary scholar Sneja Gunew argues that the episode illustrates that "multicultural" authors are often read simplistically in a way that emphasises the perceived authenticity of their writing. Zora Simic says that by presenting herself as Demidenko, Darville inadvertently produced a critique of what she describes as the ethnic essentialism of Australian literature. Jane Hyde echoes this sentiment, arguing it is unsurprising that a young person growing up in an environment where multiculturalism was increasingly central to Australian life would seek to adopt a marginalised ethnic identity. The Holocaust scholar Avril Alba suggests that the novel's reception also revealed the "shaky foundations" of Australian multiculturalism during the 1990s, revealing the tension between those who believed that it was important to forget and reconcile past injustices, and those who believed that this would undermine Australia's commitment to building a multicultural society.

Critics of the novel suggested that its success demonstrated Australia's lack of historical literacy regarding the Holocaust. Christoff writes that European publishers would have regarded the work as a "shallow, immature and ultimately antisemitic novel" unsuitable for publication. Manne concurs, arguing that the novel "revives as 'history' the Nazi myth of Jewish Bolshevism" and that European publishers would have rightly rejected it. More recent scholarship has suggested that while applying the techniques of postmodern literature to the Holocaust was once seen as inappropriate, The Hand That Signed the Paper was part of a wider trend of increasingly adventurous literary works about the Holocaust, including those that provide a more sympathetic or nuanced portrayal of its perpetrators. Thomas Shapcott regarded this as an ominous trend, calling The Hand That Signed the Paper the product of "a new generation which is distant from the horrors of the Holocaust, who see it as something they want to question, or to challenge, or to set aside".

== See also ==
- 1994 in Australian literature
- Ern Malley hoax
- Misery literature
- Mudrooroo
