= Relations (album) =

Studio album by Kathryn Williams
- Released: 2004
- Length: 44:25
- Label: Caw Records
- Producer: Kathryn Williams

Kathryn Williams chronology
Old Low Light (2002)	Relations (2004)	Over Fly Over (2005)

Relations is an album of cover versions by Kathryn Williams, released by CAW Records on 17 May 2004. The album was a BBC Radio 2 Album Of The Week, and peaked at no.76 in the UK albums chart.

The two live tracks, 'Hallelujah' & 'These Days' were recorded live at the Open Air Theatre, Regents Park, London on 10 August 2003

Williams admitted in an interview with The Independent newspaper "I don't even like covers albums" but that "I'm not trying to better the originals or debase their talent ....more a case of trying subtly to put your stamp on what you consider a brilliant song"

The album received mixed reviews with The Guardian concluding "The originals were better" and UNCUT magazine called it "an unusual album of cover versions". The MusicOMH review acknowledged "this may not be to everybody's taste (but) buy It and prepare to be seduced" with Popmatters suggesting the album was "partly recognized, partly elusive, offering an irresistible invitation to explore it further."

== Track listing ==
1. "In a Broken Dream" (David Bentley; originally recorded by Python Lee Jackson) – 3:37
2. "Birds" (Neil Young) – 2:26
3. "Thirteen" (Alex Chilton, Chris Bell; originally recorded by Big Star) – 2:56
4. "Hallelujah" (Leonard Cohen) – 5:08
5. "Ballad of Easy Rider" (Roger McGuinn; originally recorded by The Byrds) – 2:50
6. "A Guy What Takes His Time" (Ralph Rainger; originally recorded by Mae West) – 2:58
7. "Candy Says" (Lou Reed; originally recorded by The Velvet Underground) – 3:33
8. "How Can We Hang On to a Dream" (Tim Hardin) – 2:34
9. "I Started a Joke" (Barry Gibb, Robin Gibb & Maurice Gibb; originally recorded by The Bee Gees) – 3:07
10. "Easy and Me" (Lee Hazlewood) – 2:46
11. "Spit on a Stranger" (Stephen Malkmus; originally recorded by Pavement) – 3:23
12. "All Apologies" (Kurt Cobain; originally recorded by Nirvana) – 3:34
13. "Beautiful Cosmos" (Ivor Cutler) – 1:31
14. "These Days" (Jackson Browne) – 4:02

== Personnel ==
- Kathryn Williams - vocals, guitar, electric guitar, glockenspiel, sampler, theremin, backing vocals & percussion
- Laura Reid - cello, bass guitar, organ & backing vocals
- David Scott - guitar, electric guitar, bass guitar & backing vocals
- Johnny Bridgwood - double bass
- Alex Tustin - drums
- Joe Montgomery - violin

== Recording details ==
- Studio tracks recorded & mixed by Kathryn Williams & Dave Maughan, FMP Studios, Newcastle (October–November 2003)
- Live tracks ('Hallelujah' & 'These Days') recorded by John Fortis & mixed by Ed John
