= They Think It's All Acoustic... It Is Now =

Live album by Thunder
- Released: 14 May 2001
- Recorded: 4 May 2000
- Venue: Dingwalls (London, England)
- Genre: Hard rock; acoustic rock
- Length: 48:46
- Label: Papillon
- Producer: Luke Morley; Ben Matthews

Thunder live album chronology
Open the Window – Close the Door: Live in Japan (2000)	They Think It's All Acoustic... It Is Now (2001)	Live at Donington: Monsters of Rock 1990 (2001)

They Think It's All Acoustic... It Is Now is the fifth live album by English hard rock band Thunder. Recorded on 4 May 2000 at Dingwalls in London, the last date of the band's UK Farewell Tour, it was produced by the band's guitarists Luke Morley and Ben Matthews, both of whom also mixed it. The album was released on 14 May 2001 as the band's second release on Papillon Records. It was later reissued in the UK by STC Recordings on 28 September 2005.

Thunder announced in November 1999 that they were due to split up, following one last concert tour. The band's final show before disbanding took place on 4 May 2000 at Dingwalls in London, featuring an opening acoustic set followed by a regular "electric" set. They Think It's All Acoustic... It Is Now features all but one of the recordings from the acoustic set. They Think It's All Over... It Is Now, released on 10 July 2000, documents the show's main electric set.

== Background ==
On 5 November 1999, Thunder released a statement which revealed that they had decided to break up. The announcement explained that "After a great deal of exploration, discussion and soul searching, we have decided to split up. The reasons are many and complex, but to cut a long story short, we feel we have no choice. We must stress that this decision is due to outside business forces and not down to any personal or musical differences within the band." Speaking later about the band's breakup, vocalist Danny Bowes explained that "I felt by late 1999 that we couldn't compete, and I was very fed up", adding that "Basically, I'd had enough". Both Bowes and guitarist Luke Morley expressed frustration with the band's frequent change of record labels, including their latest label Eagle Records.

Starting the following month, the band completed an official farewell tour, beginning with a run of UK shows wrapping up on 11 December at The Forum in London. A Japanese leg of the tour followed in March 2000, before the band played one final UK show at Dingwalls in London. The show featured two sets – one acoustic and one electric – both of which were filmed for an intended video release, however technical problems prevented the film from being made. Recalling the show in 2016, Bowes complained that "All kinds of bullshit went on. The sound was dreadful and we all hated it. It wasn't a great way to end, although we did record the audio and the audience was great, as usual."

They Think It's All Acoustic... It Is Now was released on 14 May 2001 by Papillon Records as a limited edition single CD set. It was released later in Japan by Victor Entertainment, on 27 May 2003. Another album recorded at the same show, They Think It's All Over... It Is Now (featuring eleven of the fifteen electric songs and eight of the twelve acoustic songs), was released on 10 July 2000, and on 28 September 2005 both albums were reissued by STC Recordings.

== Track listing ==
No.	Title	Writer(s)	Length
1.	"Stand Up"	Luke Morley; Gary "Harry" James	4:15
2.	"Low Life in High Places"	Morley	6:08
3.	"This Forgotten Town"	Morley; James	4:48
4.	"Pinball Wizard" (The Who cover)	Pete Townshend	3:48
5.	"Once in a Lifetime"	Morley	5:37
6.	"My Brother Jake" (Free cover)	Paul Rodgers; Andy Fraser	3:14
7.	"I'm One" (The Who cover)	Townshend	2:56
8.	"Stuck in the Middle" (Stealers Wheel cover)	Gerry Rafferty; Joe Egan	4:21
9.	"Close to You" (The Carpenters cover)	Burt Bacharach; Hal David	3:13
10.	"Lola" (The Kinks cover)	Ray Davies	3:54
11.	"A Better Man"	Morley	6:32
Total length:			48:46

== Personnel ==
- Danny Bowes – vocals
- Luke Morley – guitar, backing vocals, harmonica, production, mixing
- Ben Matthews – guitar, keyboards, backing vocals, production, mixing
- Chris Childs – bass, backing vocals
- Gary "Harry" James – drums, percussion, backing vocals, guitar
- Tim Summerhayes – engineering
- Hugh Turvey – photography
- Masa Ito – liner notes

== Bibliography ==
- McIver, Joel (October 2016), Giving the Game Away: The Thunder Story, London, England: Omnibus Press (published 11 November 2016), ISBN 978-1785581373
