= The Quickening (Kathryn Williams album) =

Studio album by Kathryn Williams
- Released: 22 February 2010
- Label: One Little Indian

Kathryn Williams chronology
Two (2008)	The Quickening (2010)	Playing Out: Songs For Children & Robots (2010)

The Quickening is the eighth album by Kathryn Williams and her first on the One Little Indian record label. The album was released on 22 February 2010.

== Critical reception ==
Professional ratings
Review scores
Source	Rating
AllMusic	4/5 stars
Pop Matters	8/10 stars

The MusicOMH reviewer observed "still the same intricately constructed folk-pop songs and unabashedly honest lyrics" with the BBC's Jude Rogers regarding Williams as "A soft soul with hard edges who reminds us that quietness can resound so loudly.

== Track listing ==
All tracks composed by Kathryn Williams; except where indicated

1. 50 White Lines (Kathryn Williams, David Scott) (2:47)
2. Just A Feeling (3:29)
3. Winter Is Sharp (2:25)
4. Wanting And Waiting (3:54)
5. Black Oil (1:24)
6. Just Leave (3:11)
7. Smoke (2:17)
8. Cream Of The Crop (Kathryn Williams, David Scott) (5:00)
9. There Are Keys (3:19)
10. Noble Guesses (Kathryn Williams, Nev Clay) (3:40)
11. Little Lesson (Kathryn Williams, Nev Clay, Simon Edwards) (2:34)
12. Up North (3:47)

== Personnel ==
- Kathryn Williams – vocals, guitar & backing vocals
- Leo Abrahams – guitar, electric guitar, loops, hurdy gurdy, bandura & mellotron
- Kate St John – accordion, piano, hurdy gurdy & backing vocals
- Anthony Kerr – vibraphone & marimba
- Simon Edwards – electric bass, stand up bass, marimbula, bass harmonica & backing vocals
- Martyn Barker – drums & backing vocals
- Neil MacColl – guitar, banjo, mandolin & backing vocals
- Marry Waterson – backing vocals
- David Wrench – talking
- Emma Latham – backing vocals

== Recording details ==
- Produced by Kate St John & Kathryn Williams
- Artwork by Neil De Flohic & Thomas Kerr
- Mixed by Kathryn Williams & David Wrench
- Recorded At Bryn Derwen Studios
