= Old Low Light =

Studio album by Kathryn Williams
- Released: 30 September 2002
- Label: CAW / EastWest Records
- Producer: Head, Dave Maughan, Kathryn Williams

Kathryn Williams chronology
Little Black Numbers (2000)	Old Low Light (2002)	Relations (2004)

Old Low Light is Kathryn Williams' third album, released on EastWest Records on 30 September 2002. The Guardian newspaper regarded it as a disappointing follow-up to the Mercury-nominated Little Black Numbers with The Independent suggesting Williams "applies a subtle measured approach to songs whose ambiguities linger long after they have finished". The track "Old Low Light #2" does not appear on this album but is on her fifth album release, 'Over Fly Over'.

== Track listing ==
1. "Little Black Numbers" – 2:54
2. "White, Blue and Red" – 2:24
3. "Mirrorball" – 5:03
4. "Devices" – 3:20
5. "Daydream and Saunter" – 3:57
6. "Beatles" – 3:40
7. "Wolf" – 3:39
8. "Tradition" – 3:21
9. "Swimmer" – 2:41
10. "On For You" – 2:42
11. "No One Takes You Home" – 5:27
12. "3AM Phonecall" – 2:24

== Personnel ==
- Kathryn Williams – vocals, shaker and guitar
- Laura Reid – strings, backing vocals and organ
- Johnny Bridgwood – double bass and backing vocals
- Alex Tustin – drums, backing vocals and percussion
- Graham Hardy – flugelhorn and trumpet
- Gail Hutchinson – viola
- David Scott – piano and backing vocals

== Recording details ==
- Recorded at Monnow Valley, Wild Trax and Head studios
- Produced by Head and Kathryn Williams
- Artwork photography by Neil De Flohic and Margaret Williams
