= Midnight Chorus =

Studio album by Kathryn Williams and Carol Ann Duffy
- Released: 3 December 2021
- Studio: Breakdown Palace Studios
- Label: One Little Independent
- Producer: Neill MacColl

Kathryn Williams chronology
Songs from the Novel 'Greatest Hits' (2017)	Midnight Chorus (2021)	Night Drives (2022)

Midnight Chorus is the thirteenth studio album by Kathryn Williams, a Christmas-themed song collection in collaboration with British poet and playwright Dame Carol Ann Duffy, released by One Little Independent on 3 December 2021.

The pair met at Niddfest literary festival in 2016 and commenced writing songs together at Moniack Mhor centre in Scotland in early 2020. The album was put together remotely during 2021 due to the COVID-19 pandemic with producer Neill MacColl and fellow musicians Michele Stodart of the Magic Numbers, Astrid Williamson, Polly Paulusma, Sam Parton and Kate St John.

The album received positive reviews, with Narc magazine claiming the album contains "something suitable for everyone's festive celebrations", The Scotsman calling it "a gorgeous collaboration ... pick of the Christmas crop", and The Arts Desk concluding it captures the "intangible qualities of the season with all its bittersweet anticipations and disappointments".

== Track listing ==
All songs are written by Kathryn Williams and Carol Ann Duffy, except where noted.

1. "Hang Fire" – 3:46
2. "Hidden Meanings" – 3:05
3. "Christmas Moon" – 3:58
4. "(Please Be) Somewhere" – 3:45
5. "Come All Ye Doubtful" – 4:03
6. "Cariad" – 3:22
7. "Apostle" (Williams, Duffy, Sam Parton) – 3:13
8. "Dear Lord" – 3:56
9. "Moniack Mohr" – 3:28
10. "Snow Angel" – 3:34
11. "Hope Street" – 4:02
12. "Midnight Chorus" – 3:12

== Personnel ==
- Kathryn Williams – vocals, guitar, piano, organ, percussion
- Neill MacColl – guitars, bass, banjo, ukulele, keyboards, harmonica, backing vocals
- Kate St John – piano, keyboards, oboe, cor anglais, string arrangements
- Chris Jones – drums, percussion
- David Ford – drums
- Michele Stodart – bass, backing vocals
- Emily Barker – backing vocals
- Polly Paulusma – guitar, mandolin, backing vocals
- Astrid Williamson – piano, backing vocals
- Sam Parton – banjo, backing vocals
- Sam Amidon – fiddle

Production

- Neill MacColl – producer, engineer
- Dave Izumi – mixing at Echo Zoo studios
- Kathryn Williams – cover art and booklet illustrations
