= Little Black Numbers =

Studio album by Kathryn Williams
- Released: 2000
- Recorded: 2000
- Genre: Folk
- Length: 43:52 (Europe/Australia)
- Label: Caw Records

Kathryn Williams chronology
Dog Leap Stairs (1999)	Little Black Numbers (2000)	Old Low Light (2002)

Professional ratings
Review scores
Source	Rating
AllMusic	4.5/5 stars

Little Black Numbers is the second studio album by Kathryn Williams released by CAW Records in 2000 in the United Kingdom. It was the release that saw her nominated for the Mercury Music Prize and gain significant media exposure.in the UK.

The album is dedicated to the memory of her friend Mike Tunner with the song 'Fell Down Fast' concerning her reaction to his death and their friendship

The song entitled "Little Black Numbers" featured on Williams's next album, Old Low Light.

== Track listing ==
All songs written by Kathryn Williams except where stated.

1. "We Dug A Hole" – 4:26
2. "Soul To Feet" – 4:07
3. "Stood" – 3:21
4. "Jasmine Hoop" – 3:55
5. "Fell Down Fast" – 5:36
6. "Flicker" – 3:29
7. "Intermission" (Laura Reid, Kathryn Williams) – 1:33
8. "Tell The Truth As If It Were Lies" – 4:07
9. "Morning Song" – 2:33
10. "Toocan" – 2:24
11. "Each Star We See" (Kathryn Williams, middle-eight and opening chords by Dan Moscardi) – 4:27
12. "We Came Down From The Trees" – 3:46

== Personnel ==
- Kathryn Williams - vocals, guitar
- Laura Reid - cello
- Alex Tustin - drums, congas, bongos, tambourine, shaker
- David Scott - classical guitar, vocals
- Jonny Bridgwood - double bass
- Laura Mundy - flute
- Emma Williams - vocals
- Mike Latham - vocals
- Dan Robinson - tablas
- Dan Moscardini - 12 string guitar, Hammond organ, vocals, glockenspiel
- Neil Le Flohic - vocals
- Amy Reid - saxophone
- Dan Robinson - piano

== Recording details ==
Recorded at Face Studios, Newcastle

Photography by Mark Winkley & Dean Bowen
