= Crown Electric =

Studio album by Kathryn Williams
- Released: 30 September 2013
- Label: One Little Indian
- Producer: Neill MacColl

Kathryn Williams chronology
| The Pond (2012) | Crown Electric (2013) | Hypoxia (2015) |

Professional ratings
Review scores
| Source | Rating |
|---|---|
| Clash Magazine | 8/10 stars |
| MusicOMH | 4/5 stars |

Crown Electric is Kathryn Williams ninth album, released by One Little Indian on 30 September 2013. Its title refers to the Memphis power company that Elvis Presley was employed by during his pre fame years and features in that album track "Gave It Away" "Elvis drove trucks for Crown Electric before he was The King". The Metro newspaper dubbed the album 'Magnificent and melancholic with Clash magazine suggesting the album added "a new dimension to her sound"

== Track listing ==
1. Underground 3:42
2. Gave It Away 3:22
3. Heart Shaped Stone 3:38
4. Count 3:32
5. Out Of Time 3:34
6. Monday Morning 3:37
7. Darkness Light 3:40
8. Picture Book 4:52
9. Morning Twilight 3:18
10. Arwen 3:37
11. Tequila 4:46
12. Sequins 3:43
13. The Known 2:58

== Personnel ==
- Kathryn Williams - guitar / vocals
- Neill MacColl - guitars / keyboards / backing vocals
- Jon Thorne - Double bass
- Luke Flowers - Drums
- Ben Trigg - Cello
- Jonny Enright - Trombone
- Ed Harcourt - piano on 'Darkness Light', 'Morning Twilight' & 'Sequins' & vocals on 'Morning Twilight'
- James Yorkston - backing vocals on 'Arwen'
- Chris Sheehan - backing vocals and guitar on 'Arwen'
- Andy Bruce - backing vocals and guitar on 'Tequila' & 'backing vocals on 'Arwen'
- Andy Nunn - electric piano and Hammond organ on 'The Known'

== Recording ==
Produced By Neill MacColl

Recorded at Bryn Derwen Studios, Konk Studios, 50:50 Studios, The Cave & Ed's living room

Engineered & mixed by David Wrench
