= Playing Out: Songs For Children & Robots =

Studio album by The Crayonettes
- Released: 9 September 2010

The Crayonettes chronology
The Quickening (2010)	Playing Out: Songs For Children & Robots (2010)	The Pond (2012)

Playing Out: Songs For Children & Robots is a side project by Kathryn Williams, released on CAW Records on 9 September 2010. It is a collaboration with Anna Spencer (formerly of punk band Delicate Vomit) with both using their own sons as a focus group

== Critical reception ==
The Guardian regarded the songs "sufficiently simple for a child to love but with enough depth that they don't drive parents mad".

== Track listing ==
1. Robots In The Rain—3:25
2. Disco Teeth—2:50
3. Rainy Day—1:12
4. Hopscotch—3:24
5. Emergency—2:53
6. Sweet On The Floor—1:53
7. Lets Dance On The Moon—3:16
8. Spooky Way Home—3:05
9. How Hot Is A Toad? -- 2:16
10. Pirates On The Bus—2:36
11. Illegal—3:09

== Personnel ==
- Kathryn Williams – vocals & guitar
- Anna Spencer – vocals & instruments
- Simon Edwards—double bass
- Gayle Hutchinson—viola

== Recording details ==
- Illustrations by Sammi Solar
- Engineered by Kathryn Williams
- Mastered by Denis Blackham
- Mixed by David Wrench
