= Leave to Remain (album) =

Studio album by Kathryn Williams
- Released: October 1, 2006
- Recorded: July 2006
- Genre: Folk
- Length: 52:19
- Label: Caw Records

Kathryn Williams chronology
Over Fly Over (2003)	Leave to Remain (2006)	Two (2008)

Professional ratings
Review scores
Source	Rating
The Guardian	4/5 stars
Neu! Magazine	8/10 stars

Leave to Remain is the sixth studio album by Kathryn Williams released on CAW Records on 1 October 2006. It was her first to feature Kate St John who would produce her next solo album, The Quickening, in 2010.

The track 'Stevie' on the album refers to the poet and novelist Stevie Smith with its chorus echoing the title of her poem 'Not Waving But Drowning' . The song premiered at 'The Beat Goes On' at the Royal Albert Hall in 2005, an event to celebrate the 40th anniversary of the 1965 International Poetry Incarnation at the same venue

Drowned In Sound suggested the album "is captivating, even if it's not all that it could be" with Popmatters review concluding that it's "an album that is extremely hard to get out of one's head indeed". and The Guardian chiming 'both beautiful and intense, her best album yet'

== Track listing ==
1. "Blue onto You" - 2:02
2. "Let It Happen" - 3:35
3. "Sustain Pedal" - 2:56
4. "Stevie" - 3:03
5. "Sandy L" - 3:53
6. "When" - 3:52
7. "Glass Bottom Boat" - 4:44
8. "Hollow" - 3:31
9. "Opened" - 2:27
10. "Room in My Head" - 4:39

== Personnel ==
- Kathryn Williams – Vocals, Guitar, Piano, Organ, Percussion & Backing Vocals
- Laura Reid – Cello, Piano, Glockenspiel & Backing Vocals
- Kate St John – Oboe
- David Scott - Guitar
- Johnny Bridgwood – Double Bass
- Nell Catchpole – Viola
- Julia Singleton – Violin
- Stephen Morris – Violin
- Tim Weller – Drums
- Keith Morris – Bass Clarinet
- Peter Whyman – Clarinet
- Graham Hardy – Fluegelhorn & Trumpet
- Marcus Bates – French Horn
- Steve Honest – Pedal Steel Guitar
- Alex Tustin – Percussion
- Brendan Murphy – Vibraphone

== Recording details ==
- Kate St John – String, Woodwind, French Horn arrangements & backing vocals
- Produced by Darius Kedros & Kathryn Williams
- Management – Alan McGee, Creation Management
- Mastered by Kevin Metcalfe
