= Songs from the Novel 'Greatest Hits' =

Studio album by Kathryn Williams
- Released: 16 June 2017
- Label: One Little Indian
- Producer: Romeo Stodart

Kathryn Williams chronology
Resonator (2016)	Songs from the Novel 'Greatest Hits' (2017)

Songs from the Novel 'Greatest Hits' is the twelfth studio album by British singer-songwriter, Kathryn Williams and a collaboration with the novelist Laura Barnett based on her second novel, Greatest Hits.

The project was conceived from Barnett's interest in Williams' Hypoxia album centred on Sylvia Plath's 'The Bell Jar' novel and her concept of her own novel having a soundtrack of the protagonist, Cass Wheeler's music. Williams wrote the music to the 16 sets of lyrics in the novel Barnett uses to illustrate the events in Cass' life that bookend each chapter along with producer Romeo Stodart .

The album and book were released simultaneously, with The Irish Times suggesting the album ran 'gamut of emotions and musical styles from pastoral playfulness to jagged edged brittleness'

== Track listing ==
1. "Common Ground"
2. "Architect"
3. "Living Free"
4. "I Wrote You a Love Song"
5. "Just Us Two"
6. "Road of Shadows" s
7. "Don't Step on the Cracks"
8. "She Wears a Dress"
9. "Lilies"
10. "Brightest Star"
11. "In This Garden"
12. "Queen of the Snow"
13. "Home"
14. "Edge of the World"
15. "Gethsemane"
16. "When Morning Comes"

Notes

- All songs written by Kathryn Williams and Laura Barnett
- Except tracks 3 and 4 written by Kathryn Williams, Laura Barnett, and Romeo Stodart
- Track 6 written by Kathryn Williams, Laura Barnett, Michele Stodart, and Polly Paulusma
- Track 13 written by Kathryn Williams, Laura Barnett, and Michele Stodart

== Personnel ==
- Kathryn Williams – vocals, piano, acoustic guitar, drum machine, bell, the twanger, toy piano
- Neill MacColl – e-bow, electric guitar, acoustic guitar, mandolin, autoharp, marxophone
- Romeo Stodart – electric guitar, acoustic guitar, piano, string machine, Hammond organ, marimba, backing vocals
- Michelle Stodart – bass guitar, percussion, bell, whistle, backing vocals
- CJ Jones – drums, congas, timpani
- Kate St John – oboe, saxophone, accordion, cor anglais
- Andy Bruce – piano, Hammond organ, wurlitzer
- Laura Barnett – backing vocals
- Recorded at Echo Zoo Studios, Eastbourne
- Produced by Romeo Stodart
- Engineered and mixed by Dave Lynch
- Additional engineering by Trevor Michael
- Horn arrangements on "I Wrote You a Love Song" by Romeo Stodart
- Horn arrangements on "She Wears a Dress" by Romeo Stodart and Kate St John
