= Dog Leap Stairs =

Studio album by Kathryn Williams
- Released: 10 May 1999
- Label: CAW Records
- Producer: Head, Danilo Moscardini, Dave Maughan, Callum Train, Steve Chahley, David Nicolson, Kathryn Williams

Kathryn Williams chronology
Dog Leap Stairs (1999)	Little Black Numbers (2000)

Dog Leap Stairs, Kathryn Williams' debut album, was released on her own label, CAW Records, on 10 May 1999 at the recording cost of £80. UNCUT magazine in the UK suggested the album drew favourable comparisons to the work of Nick Drake and Tim Buckley.

The name is a reference to Dog Leap Stairs, a well-known alleyway, with stairs, in central Newcastle upon Tyne.

== Track listing ==
All tracks composed by Kathryn Williams; except where indicated

1. "Leazes Park" (3:19)
2. "Night Came" (music: Williams, Danilo Moscardini) (3:53)
3. "What Am I Doing Here?" (3:59)
4. "No-One To Blame" (3:31)
5. "Something Like That" (3:14)
6. "Lydia" (music: Williams, Callum Train) (2:45)
7. "Handy" (2:31)
8. "Dog Without Wings" (2:27)
9. "Fade" (3:35)
10. "Madmen and Maniacs" (2:59)

== LP version ==
The vinyl edition of the album contained an additional 7" vinyl single with two extra tracks not included on the CD

1. "Kiss The Forehead"
2. "Cradle"

== Recording details ==
- All lyrics by Kathryn Williams
- Vocals, Percussion & Guitar – Kathryn Williams
- Guitar – Callum Train, Howard Askew, Danilo Moscardini
- Bass – Gary Bowden & Callum Train
- Cello – Cath Campbell & Eleanor Rodgers
- Drums – Steve Chahley & Steve Thompson
- Piano & Synths – Callum Train
- Arranged By – Callum Train, Danilo Moscardini & Kathryn Williams
- Artwork By – Kathryn Williams
- Illustration – Kathryn Williams
- Mastered By – Tim Dennen
