= The Pond (album) =

Studio album by The Pond
- Released: 28 May 2012
- Label: One Little Indian

The Pond chronology
Playing Out: Songs For Children & Robots (2010)	The Pond (2012)	Crown Electric (2013)

The Pond released by One Little Indian Records on 28 May 2012. is a side project of Kathryn Williams. The band consists of Kathryn Williams, Simon Edwards and Ginny Clee, with the project slowly developing over a two-year period. The album was mixed by Portishead's Adrian Utley.

== Reception ==
The Pond received positive reviews from critics upon release. On Metacritic, the album holds a score of 71/100 based on 5 reviews, indicating "generally favorable reviews".

MusicOMH, giving the album 4 out of 5 stars, suggested that it is "an excellent example of an established artist making a real step forward".

== Track listing ==
- All songs written by The Pond except Bebop - The Pond \ Vincent \ Davis \ Kirsch Mixed by Adrian Utley
1. Carved
2. Circle Round A Tree
3. The River
4. Pass Us By
5. The Art Of Doing Nothing
6. Memory Let Down
7. Bebop
8. Heard Shoulder
9. End Of The Pier
10. Evening Star
11. Aim

== Personnel ==
- Kathryn Williams
- Simon Edwards
- Ginny Clee
- Kirsch - rap on 'Bebop'
- Johnny Enright - trombone
- Darren Robinson - guitar on 'Aim'
