= Two (Kathryn Williams and Neill MacColl album) =

Studio album by Kathryn Williams & Neill MacColl
- Released: 3 March 2008
- Label: CAW Records

Kathryn Williams chronology
Leave to Remain (2006)	Two (2008)	The Quickening (2010)

Two is Kathryn Williams 7th studio album, released by CAW Records on 3 March 2008.

The album is a collaboration with Neill MacColl. The pair met at the Daughters of Albion concert at the Barbican in 2005 where she performed "The First Time Ever I Saw Your Face", which was written by Neill MacColl's father, Ewan MacColl. They met up in May 2007 to write and record 21 songs for the album in six days.

== Critical reception ==
Professional ratings
Review scores
Source	Rating
Drowned In Sound	8/10 stars
The Guardian	3/5 stars
PopMatters	8/10 stars

The album garnered positive reviews with The Independent calling the album "a magical meeting of intuitive musical minds". The BBC's Michael Quinn claimed it is "a disc to be cherished from the first note to the last". Drowned in Sound said "There is such an ease to each composition, as if they have been played for years". The Guardian wrote "it would be a major triumph if there was just a little variety in the mood & pace".

== Track listing ==
1. 6am Corner—3:22
2. Innocent When You Dream—3:15 (Tom Waits)
3. Come With Me—3:27
4. Before It Goes—3:06
5. Blue Fields—3:15
6. Frame—3:20
7. Grey Goes—3:01
8. Weather Forever—3:40
9. Shoulders—3:46
10. Armchair—2:42
11. Rolling Down—2:31
12. All—1:07
13. Holes In Your Life—3:02

== Personnel ==
- Kathryn Williams – vocals, guitar, mellotron, harmonium & organ
- Neill MacColl – vocals, guitar, dulcimer & autoharp
- Martyn Baker – drums & percussion
- Simon Edwards – electric bass & upright bass
- Tobias Froberg – piano
- Jo Montgomery – violin
- Graham Hardy – flugelhorn & trumpet

== Recording details ==
- Recorded – "in very well creosoted sheds in Cambridgeshire" \ horns & violin in Kathryn’s garage and autoharp in Neill’s basement
- Mixed at The Dairy Studios
- Artwork by Kathryn Williams
- Produced by Neil MacColl and Kathryn Williams
