= Resonator (Kathryn Williams album) =

Studio album by Kathryn Williams & Anthony Kerr
- Released: 11 November 2016
- Genre: Jazz
- Length: 33:52
- Label: One Little Indian

Kathryn Williams chronology
Hypoxia (2015)	Resonator (2016)	Songs From The Novel 'Greatest Hits' (2017)

Resonator is Kathryn Williams eleventh studio album and a collaboration with jazz musician and vibraphone player, Anthony Kerr. The album is a set of jazz standards that the pair worked on over a six-year period

The album has received mixed reviews with Musikexpress claimed the album 'liberates oft-heard standards from the corset of arbitrariness' with Intro adding 'Only an muted jazz trumpet and a distant double bass enrich the charged silence which often ends in unexpected slowness'. Williams asserted on The Afterword podcast that 'I don't mind the different reactions that the album has got because it makes me feel like I'm doing something right.'

== Track listing ==
1. You Don't Know What Love Is (Don Raye / Gene de Paul)
2. My Funny Valentine (Richard Rodgers & Lorenz Hart)
3. Ev'ry Time We Say Goodbye (Cole Porter)
4. I'm A Fool To Want You (Frank Sinatra / Joel Herron \ Jack Wolf)
5. Like Someone In Love (Jimmy Van Heusen / Johnny Burke)
6. The Very Thought Of You (Ray Noble)
7. The Man I Love (George & Ira Gershwin)
8. Embraceable You (George & Ira Gershwin)
9. Stormy Weather (Harold Arlen & Ted Koehler)
10. Autumn Leaves (Joseph Kosma / Jacques Prevert)

== Personnel ==
- Kathryn Williams – vocals
- Anthony Kerr – vibraphone
- Jon Thorne – double bass
- Martin Shaw – trumpet & flugel
- Simon Edwards – string synth & sonics
- All songs arranged by Kathryn Williams & Anthony Kerr
- Recorded and engineered by Simon Edwards
- Mixed by Dave Izumi at Echo Zoo Studios
- Mastered by Mandy Powell at Black Saloon Studios
