= Night Drives =

Studio album by Kathryn Williams
- Released: 15 July 2022
- Studio: Wolf Cave
- Label: One Little Indian
- Producer: Ed Harcourt

Kathryn Williams chronology
Midnight Chorus (2021)	Night Drives (2022)	Mystery Park (2025)

Night Drives is the fourteenth studio album by English singer-songwriter Kathryn Williams, released on 15 July 2022.

Night Drives was Williams' first album to receive a Dinked edition vinyl release (No. 194, featuring a gold coloured vinyl and alternative artwork sleeve painted by Williams) limited to 500 copies worldwide.

== Reception ==
Professional ratings
Review scores
Source	Rating
The Arts Desk	3/5 stars
Mojo	4/5 stars
Uncut	8/10

The Arts Desk gave the album a favorable review: "Williams' stunning, plaintive voice combines with her rich, literary way with words, the imagery and ideas she paints in the listener's mind". KLOF Mag noted, "Williams continues to explore rather than simply settle into an old comfortable groove....finds a way to humanize the machines she works with while still singing about things that matter".

The album received a 8/10 review from Uncut's Wyndham Wallace, who called it "hardly playlist material," and a four-star rating from Mojo. The Crack stated, "Sonically, it's more expansive than some of her other stuff, with cinematic vibes being supplied by some well judged electronica."

== Track listing ==
Night Drives track listing
No.	Title	Length
1.	"Human"	2:44
2.	"Answer in the Dark"	4:25
3.	"Chime Like a Bell"	3:01
4.	"Radioactive"	3:42
5.	"The Me for You"	3:26
6.	"Moon Karaoke"	3:54
7.	"Night Drive to the Lake"	5:12
8.	"Put the Needle on the Record"	3:27
9.	"Magnets"	3:50
10.	"The Brightest"	4:22
11.	"Starry Heavens"	3:14
12.	"I Am Rich in All That I've Lost"	4:03
Total length:		45:20

== Personnel ==
- Kathryn Williams – vocals, acoustic guitar, electric guitar, cello, mandolin
- Ed Harcourt – guitar, drum programming, synths, vocoder guitar, piano, bass guitar and percussion
- Neill MacColl – guitar
- Simon Edwards – acoustic & bass guitar
- John Alder – backward guitar, cello & mandolin
- Andy Bruce – piano & guitar
- Amy Langley – cello
- Emily Barker – backing vocals
- Recorded in the Wolf Cabin, Oxfordshire
