= Over Fly Over =

Studio album by Kathryn Williams
- Released: 9 May 2005
- Label: CAW Records

Kathryn Williams chronology
Relations (2004)	Over Fly Over (2005)	Leave to Remain (2006)

Over Fly Over is the fifth album by Kathryn Williams. It was released on CAW Records on 9 May 2005.

The Guardian newspaper thought the songs "beautifully wrought and not without its own kind of gentle surprises", and MusicOMH called it "the sound of a woman reborn...her best album yet". The BBC, however, suggested "it feels over produced, undercooked, slipping through one ear and falling out the other."

== Track listing ==
1. Three – 4:19
2. Indifference #1 – 3:01
3. Breath – 3:48
4. Old Low Light #2 – 4:37
5. Just Like A Birthday – 3:38
6. Shop Window – 2:36
7. Beachy Head – 5:35
8. Escaping – 3:10
9. City Streets – 4:14
10. Untilt The Dark – 1:56
11. Baby Blues – 3:51
12. Full Colour – 3:52

== Personnel ==
- Kathryn Williams – guitar, vocals, piano, percussion & backing vocals
- Laura Reid – cello, piano & backing vocals
- David Scott – guitar, organ & backing vocals
- Keith Morris - bass clarinet
- Johnny Bridgwood – double bass & “noises”
- Alex Tustin – drums & percussion
- Steve Honest – pedal steel guitar
- Graham Hardy – flugelhorn & trumpet
- Brendan Murphy – vibraphone
- Jo Montgomery – violin

== Recording details ==
All songs written by Kathryn Williams except:

Track 1 – written by Kathryn Williams, David Scott & Laura Reid

Track 2 – written by Kathryn Williams & David Scott

Track 8 & 10 – written by Kathryn Williams & Laura Reid

Recorded by Dave Maughan in Newcastle and Darius Kedros in London.
