= Hypoxia (album) =

Studio album by Kathryn Williams
- Released: 15 June 2015
- Label: One Little Indian
- Producer: Ed Harcourt

Kathryn Williams chronology
Crown Electric (2013)	Hypoxia (2015)	Resonator (2016)

Professional ratings
Review scores
Source	Rating
The Irish Times	4/5 stars
Louder Than War	9/10 stars

Hypoxia is Kathryn Williams tenth album and was released by One Little Indian on 15 June 2015. The songs were initially conceived as a result of a 2013 writing commission from New Writing North in conjunction with the Durham Book Festival's 50th anniversary celebration of the publication of Sylvia Plath's 'The Bell Jar' novel.

Kathryn performed five songs at the festival and completed writing the project whilst touring her 'Crown Electric' release. "So I was writing the songs in Travelodges and on the side of the A1 in between gigs. Those were some dark days with only the sound of the motorway and a Little Chef to drown my sorrows in,"

The Scottish Herald wrote the album was "a collection of rare eloquence and spectacular beauty" with Clash Magazine concluding "By inhabiting and responding to a genuinely significant work of literature, Williams has produced her own spellbinding work of art"

== Track listing ==
From AllMusic.

- Electric
- Mirrors
- Battleships
- Cuckoo
- Beating Heart
- Tango With Marco
- When Nothing Meant Less
- The Mind Is Its Own Place
- Part Of Us

== Personnel ==
From Discogs.

- Kathryn Williams: vocals and guitar
- Ed Harcourt: piano, drums, harmonium, vocals, optigan, organ, pedal made soundscape stuff, toy piano and guitar.
- David Page: guitar, electric guitar, vocals.
- Jon Thorne: double bass, electric bass.
- Neill Maccoll: guitar and pedal soundscape stuff.

== Recording details ==
All songs written by Kathryn Williams, except:

Cuckoo written by Ed Harcourt and Kathryn Williams;

Battleships written by Jon Throne, Kathryn Williams, Ben Trigg and David Page;

Part Of Us written by David Saw and Kathryn Williams

Engineered and produced by Ed Harcourt at Rooks Nest.

Mixed by David Isumi Lynch.

Mastered by Denis Blackman at Skye.
