= In a Broken Dream =

Single by Python Lee Jackson

from the album In a Broken Dream
- B-side: "Doing Fine"
- Released: 1970
- Recorded: 1969
- Genre: Rock
- Label: Young Blood International; GNP Crescendo
- Songwriter: David Keith Bentley
- Producer: Miki Dallon

"In a Broken Dream" is a 1970 song and single by Australian rock band Python Lee Jackson featuring vocals from Rod Stewart.

Re-released in 1972, it entered the UK chart in September, reaching number 3 in October. Stewart's vocals are not credited on the record label, although the popularity of the song can be attributed to his vocals and star profile.

== Song history ==
=== Original recording ===
The song was written in the 1960s by the group's keyboard player and singer, Dave Bentley. Believing his vocals were not correct for the song, Bentley brought in Rod Stewart. Before being successful with Faces or in his solo career, Stewart was recruited as a session musician for the song and paid by being bought a new set of seat covers for his car. Issued in October 1970, it did not make the charts. Re-released in 1972 following the rise to stardom by Stewart, the song reached number 56 in the US charts before greater success in the UK later that year. It reached No. 74 in Canada.

The song appeared on the soundtrack for the 1996 film Breaking the Waves.

This original version was also included on the deluxe version of Stewart's 2015 studio album Another Country.

=== Cover versions, samples and re-recordings ===
Stewart re-recorded the song in 1992 with David Gilmour and John Paul Jones but did not release it. The recording was eventually released in 2009 as part of The Rod Stewart Sessions 1971–1998 box set.

English band Thunder released a cover version as a single in 1995.

Kathryn Williams included a version on her 2004 covers album Relations.

The Python Lee Jackson version was later sampled in ASAP Rocky's 2015 single "Everyday", which credited Stewart as a feature and also guest starred Miguel and Mark Ronson.
