= Judith Ryan =

Professor of Germanic literatures

Academic background
- Education: University of Sydney, University of Münster
- Thesis: Umschlag und Verwandlung Poet. Struktur u. Dichtungstheorie in R. M. Rilkes Lyrik d. mittleren Perodie (1907-1914) (1970)

Judith L. Ryan is the emerita Robert K. and Dale J. Weary Research Professor of German and Comparative Literature at Harvard University. She is known for her work on German studies from the 19th century to the present.

== Education and career ==
A graduate of the University of Sydney, Australia, she received her doctorate at the University of Münster, Germany, in 1970. Before joining the faculty at Harvard University in 1985, she taught at Smith College in Northampton, Massachusetts.

As of 2025 she is the emerita Robert K. and Dale J. Weary Research Professor of German and Comparative Literature.

== Awards and honors ==
Ryan received the Humboldt Research Award in 2009-2010. She received the Basilius Award for Germanics for her book The Uncompleted Past: Postwar German Novels and the Third Reich and was twice awarded the Max Kade Prize for Best Article of the year in The German Quarterly (in 1982 and 1990).

== Selected publications ==
- Ryan, Judith. The Cambridge Introduction to German Poetry. Cambridge: Cambridge University Press, 2012.
- Ryan, Judith. The Novel After Theory. New York: Columbia University Press, 2012.
- Wellbery, David, and Judith Ryan. A New History of German Literature. Cambridge, MA: Harvard University Press 2004, 2004.
- Ryan, Judith. Rilke, Modernism and Poetic Tradition. Cambridge UK: Cambridge University Press, 1999.
- Ryan, Judith. The Vanishing Subject: Early Psychology and Literary Modernism. Chicago: Chicago University Press, 1991.
- Ryan, Judith. The Uncompleted Past: Postwar German Novels and the Third Reich. Detroit: Wayne State University Press, 1983.
- Ryan, Judith. Umschlag und Verwandlung. Poetische Struktur und Dichtungstheorie in R. M. Rilkes Lyrik der mittleren Periode (1907-1914). Munich: Winkler, 1972.
