= Anthony Kerr =

British jazz vibraphone player (born 1965)

Anthony Kerr is a British jazz vibraphone player, who has performed and recorded internationally with Georgie Fame, Charlie Watts, BBC Big Band, Robbie Williams, Joe Lovano, Jacqui Dankworth, and Courtney Pine. His compositions have been broadcast on BBC Radio.

He teaches vibraphone and jazz improvisation at the Royal College of Music in London and produces and records music from his home studio in Hertfordshire.

== Biography ==
Anthony Michael Kerr was born in Belfast, Northern Ireland on 16 October 1965. From 1981 till 1984 he received his education at the Belfast School of Music. He moved to New York to study vibes and marimba with David Friedman and Kenny Werner at the The New School for Social Research from 1986 to 1988. He was the recipient of a scholarship to The New School for Jazz and Contemporary Music in 1987.

After completing his studies he went back to Ireland where he became a percussionist in the RTÉ Symphony Orchestra. He subsequently worked as a percussionist at the Royal National Theatre in London as a freelance musician while simultaneously working to establish himself as jazz musician. He performed with saxophonists Tim Garland (1989 and later) and Alan Barnes (from 1993); singers Georgie Fame (1990 and later), Norma Winstone (from 1993), and Claire Martin (1993 and later); and pianist Mike Westbrook (from 1992).

Later Kerr worked as a jazz musician with such artist as John Taylor, Charlie Watts, Louis Stewart, Peter King, a bandleader, which he travelled around Europe with. While collaborating with others, he has simultaneously led his own group and conducted jazz workshops in Belfast. He also toured with Irish Youth Jazz Orchestra. He was voted best instrumentalist in the 1994 British Jazz Awards, and Young Jazz Musician of the Year in 1995. He also won nominations in the ‘Rising Star’ category in 1995, 1996 and 1998.

Kerr performed regularly with singer Jacqui Dankworth in 1993–1994; during which time he collaborated with her on his first album, First Cry. In 1997 he led and recorded with his own quartet at Ronnie Scott’s club in London; producing his second album, Now Hear This. In 1998 he became a member of the BBC Big Band with whom he this latter ensemble on a broadcast from the North Sea Jazz Festival in 2003. In his work with BBC Big Band he has collaborated with Ian Shaw and a saxophonist Dale Barlow.

He has also played in the Mallet Band with Justin Woodward, Stewe Brown and Geoff Gascoyne.

== Albums ==
- First Cry, with Jacqui Dankworth
- Now Hear This (1997)
- Resonator, with Kathryn Williams (2016)
