= David Bentley (journalist) =

Australian journalist and musician

David Bentley is an Australian journalist and musician.

Bentley is known for writing the 1969 hit "In a Broken Dream" for his band Python Lee Jackson, in which he was a keyboard player and singer. "In a Broken Dream", featuring Rod Stewart, peaked at #3 on the UK singles chart.

As a freelance journalist, Bentley has worked as a foreign correspondent, travel writer, food critic, columnist and feature writer.

In 1995, Bentley was awarded the Gold Walkley for exposing a literary hoax for The Courier Mail, involving Miles Franklin Award winner Helen Demidenko, author of The Hand That Signed the Paper, who had falsely claimed Ukrainian ancestry.

The controversy has since been widely discussed, with Bentley credited with uncovering one of Australia's most intriguing literary hoaxes.
