= A Better Man (Thunder song) =

1993 single by Thunder

Single by Thunder

from the album Laughing on Judgement Day
- Released: 1 February 1993
- Length: 3:42
- Label: EMI
- Songwriter(s): Luke Morley
- Producer(s): Andy Taylor; Luke Morley

Thunder singles chronology
"Everybody Wants Her" (1992)	"A Better Man" (1993)	"Like a Satellite" (1993)

"A Better Man" is a song by English hard rock band Thunder, released as a single in 1993, taken from their album Laughing on Judgement Day. It is the only Thunder song in which Gary James plays acoustic guitar instead of his usual drums. It is also the only song he sings a part of live, as he occasionally sings the song's final line.

The song is the band's highest-charting UK single, reaching No. 18 on the UK Singles Chart in February 1993.

== Track listing ==
Maxi-CD

1. "A Better Man" – 3:43
2. "Bigger Than Both of Us" – 4:26
3. "Higher Ground" (live) – 5:35
4. "Lazy Sunday Afternoon" (live) – 3:31

== Charts ==
Chart (1993)	Peak position
Europe (Eurochart Hot 100)	55
Iceland (Íslenski Listinn Topp 40)	18
UK Singles (OCC)	18

== Release history ==
Region	Date	Format(s)	Label(s)	Ref.
United Kingdom	1 February 1993	7-inch vinyl; 12-inch vinyl; CD; cassette	EMI	
Japan	10 March 1993	CD	EMI	
Australia	28 March 1993	CD; cassette	EMI	
