= Love Walked In (Thunder song) =

1991 single by Thunder

Single by Thunder

from the album Backstreet Symphony
- Released: 11 February 1991
- Genre: Rock
- Length: 6:25
- Label: EMI
- Songwriter: Luke Morley
- Producer: Andy Taylor

Thunder singles chronology
"She's So Fine (re-release)" (1990)	"Love Walked In" (1991)	"Low Life in High Places" (1992)

"Love Walked In" is a song by English rock band Thunder, released in February 1991 as the last single from their 1990 debut album, Backstreet Symphony. The power ballad is the band's second-highest-charting UK single, reaching No. 21 in February 1991.

== Track listing ==
12-inch

A. "Love Walked In" (L.P. version)
B1. "Flawed to Perfection" (demo)
B2. "Until My Dying Day" (live)

== Charts ==
Chart (1991–1992)	Peak position
Europe (Eurochart Hot 100)	74
UK Singles (OCC)	21
UK Airplay (Music Week)	45
US Mainstream Rock (Billboard)	31

== Release history ==
Region	Date	Format(s)	Label(s)	Ref.
United Kingdom	11 February 1991	7-inch vinyl; 10-inch vinyl; 12-inch vinyl; CD; cassette	EMI	
Australia	24 June 1991	7-inch vinyl; CD; cassette	EMI	
