= Kathryn Williams =

English singer-songwriter

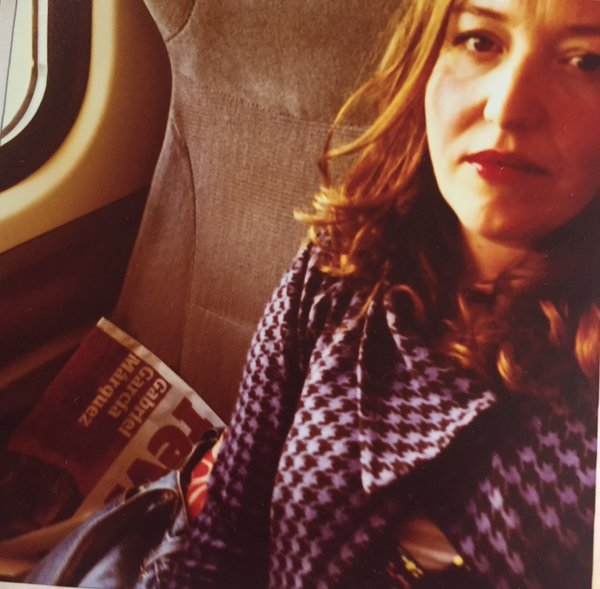
- Kathryn Williams 2016

Background information
- Born: Kathryn Williams; 15 February 1974 (age 52); Liverpool, England
- Genre: Folk
- Occupation: Musician
- Instruments: Vocals, guitar
- Years active: 1998–present
- Formerly of: The Pond
- Website: www.kathrynwilliams.co.uk

Kathryn Williams (born 15 February 1974, Liverpool, England) is an English singer-songwriter who to date has released 14 studio albums, written and arranged for a multitude of artists, and was nominated for the 2000 Mercury Music Prize.

Williams released her first album, Dog Leap Stairs, on her own Caw Records label in 1999 with a budget of £80. The follow-up, Little Black Numbers, garnered a Mercury Prize nomination in 2000, bringing her to the attention of a wider public.

Williams has collaborated and recorded with artists including Chris Difford, Ted Barnes, Thea Gilmore, John Martyn, Joel Salakula, Tobias Froberg, Ed Harcourt, James Yorkston, Marry Waterson, Boo Hewerdine, and Paul Smith.

In March 2021 Kathryn published her debut novel The Ormering Tide via Wrecking Ball Press

'Before The Light Goes Out', Kathryn's bed-themed podcast interview series, launched in May 2022 with guests from the world of music and literature.

== Music career ==
Williams sold homemade CDs of her music at her early shows which led her to setting up her own record label, CAW Records, to release her debut album Dog Leap Stairs. After her second album, Little Black Numbers, was nominated for the Mercury Prize, she signed a licensing deal with Eastwest Records. Little Black Numbers reached No. 70 in the UK Albums Chart in 2001.

Her influences include Nina Simone, Nick Drake, Joni Mitchell, Bob Dylan, John Lennon, Simon And Garfunkel and Velvet Underground.

Throughout her career she has toured extensively solo and with bands as well as supporting roles with David Gray, Damien Rice, Ray LaMontagne, Damien Dempsey, Melanie, Be Good Tanyas, The Riptide Movement, David Gates, Beth Orton, and in 2006 she was a special guest on Tom McRae's Hotel Cafe Tour,

In 2010, Williams signed with One Little Indian Records, who released her album The Quickening, produced by Kate St John later that year.

Her second release on the label, Crown Electric, was produced by Neil MacColl. Its lead single "Heart Shaped Stone" featured a video produced and directed by James Serafinowicz and Al Campbell.

Williams performed the title song "Beyond the Sea" for The Café, first screened on Sky1 in 2011. Her songs have also featured on episodes of How I Met Your Mother, Holby City, Weeds, David Walliams' Big Swim, and C.S.I.

In 2013, Williams was commissioned by New Writing North to produce songs in celebration of 50th anniversary of the publication of Sylvia Plath's The Bell Jar. She performed five of the resulting tunes – "When Nothing Meant Less", "Battleships", "The Mind Has Its Own Place", "Tango With Marco", and "Part Of Us" – at the 10th Durham Book Festival. Teaming up with Ed Harcourt as producer, she released Hypoxia on 15 June 2015.

In 2015 Emji, a finalist on the French TV talent show Nouvelle Star, won the 11th series singing "Toboggan (You Are The One)", a song written by Williams, David Saw and John Quarmby, which was her first single.

Williams appeared with Maxïmo Park at BBC 6Music Festival, Sage, Gateshead on 21 February 2015.

In 2016, Williams released her first full length jazz project with Anthony Kerr, Resonator and undertook a tour supporting Scott Matthews as well as contributing vocals to the musical Fancy Pants written by Squeeze's Chris Difford and frequent collaborator Boo Hewerdine.

Her 12th album, a collaboration with author Laura Barnett featuring songs based on Barnett's second novel, Songs From The Novel 'Greatest Hits', was released on 16 June 2017

A multi CD box set of Kathryn's solo work from 1998 to 2015 encompassing 10 previously released albums with 10 further CDs of bonus material was released on One Little Indian 30 August 2019.

== The Crayonettes ==
Williams collaborated with friend / former member of punk band Delicate Vomit, Anna Spencer, on a new project entitled The Crayonettes. Williams and Spencer, both tired of the same old children's CD format, decided to make their own record using their own children as an in house focus group. They released the album Playing Out: Songs For Children & Robots from One Little Indian (6 September 2010). The Guardian wrote that "Pirates On the Bus" "sounds like the Moomins playing The Slits."

== The Pond ==
The Pond consisted of Williams alongside Simon Edwards, formerly of Fairground Attraction and fellow singer/songwriter Ginny Clee, releasing their self-titled CD in 2012.

BBC.co.uk called it "An elegant, charming and quietly profound record", and MOJO magazine "A whirling magimix of hypnotic, funky loops, vintage beats and sensuous harmonies".

== Willson Williams ==
Willson Williams featured Kathryn's collaboration with Scottish singer songwriter Dan Willson aka Withered Hand. Their 2024 release of the same name drew positive reviews suggesting 'they are bringing out the best in each other ....a feeling of dual purpose and fun resonating through all these tracks' and 'a tremendously life-affirming thing'. The album is one of ten shortlisted for Scottish Album Of The Year (SAY) Award 2024.

== Songwriting and art ==
Williams has been involved in writing retreats and sessions that enable songwriters to share, collaborate and produce ideas as well as learn new skills and techniques. Firstly tutoring at such events alongside Tom McRae, Samantha Parton and Chris Difford whose own retreats Williams has attended. As a result, Williams has established her own writing residential courses which took place in 2014-16.

Williams was given a New Writing North commission as poet in residence at Alnwick Garden in 2006. An audio CD Words from the Garden was released in 2007 featuring writings from Williams, Nev Clay, Emma McGordon and Anna Woodford set in a soundscape by Caroline Beck, with music by Williams and Clay.

As well as creating artwork for her debut album and Two, her collaboration with Neill MacColl, Williams produced the cover art for David Rotheray's Life Of Birds album. and Mardous' "Revolution Over The Phone" single.

Williams collaborated with The Guardian writer Tim Dowling, Chris Difford and Ed Harcourt on a 2014 Christmas single "Snowfall" in aid of The Guardian's Christmas charity appeal.

She was selected as a judge for the British Poetry Society's Ted Hughes Award for Poetry 2016 in conjunction with poet laureate, Carol Ann Duffy... She also performed specially commissioned material for 'A Poet Laureate's Peterloo' commemorating the 200th anniversary of the Peterloo massacre featuring Carol, Clare Shaw, Mark Pajak, presented by Ian McMillan and broadcast on BBC Radio 4, 11 August 2019

== Discography ==
=== Albums ===
- Dog Leap Stairs (1999)
- Little Black Numbers (2000)
- Old Low Light (2002)
- Relations (2004)
- Over Fly Over (2005)
- Leave to Remain (2006)
- Two (2008) with Neill MacColl
- The Quickening (2010)
- Crown Electric (2013)
- Hypoxia (2015)
- Resonator (2016) with Anthony Kerr
- Songs from the Novel 'Greatest Hits' (2017)
- Midnight Chorus (2021) with Carol Ann Duffy
- Night Drives (2022)
- Mystery Park (2025)

=== Side projects ===
- Playing Out: Songs For Children & Robots - The Crayonettes (2010)
- The Pond - The Pond (2012)
- Willson Williams -Willson Williams (2024)

=== Box set ===
- Anthology (2019)

=== Singles ===
- The Fade EP (1999)
- "Soul to Feet" (2000)
- "Jasmine Hoop" (2001)
- "No One Takes You Home" (2001)
- "In a Broken Dream" (2004)
- "Shop Window" (2005)
- "Beachy Head" (2005)
- "Hollow" (2006)
- "Come With Me" - with Neill MacColl (2008)
- "50 White Lines" (2010)
- "Heart Shaped Stone" (2013)
- "Monday Morning" (2014)
- "The Mind Has Its Own Place" (2015)
- "Mirrors" (2015)

== Appearances with other artists, compilations and soundtracks ==
- "Field Of Play" \ "Can't Live Without" - John Martyn Glasgow Walker album (2000)
- "Day By Day" - Badmarsh & Shri Signs album (2001) and CSI: Crime Scene Investigation soundtrack (2002)
- "Easy & Me" - Total Lee! : The Songs Of Lee Hazlewood album (2002)
- "Part Two" - Pedro's Early Pedro album (2003)
- "Heavy World" - Shiri East Rain album (2005)
- "Buzzin' Fly" - Dream Brother: The Songs of Tim & Jeff Buckley (2005)
- "Night Baking" - Colours Are Brighter album (2006)
- Thea Gilmore Harpo's Ghost album (2006)
- "You Already Know" - Bombay Bicycle Club "Evening Morning" single (2008)
- "Take It Easy" - Tobias Froberg Turn Heads album (2008)
- "I'm Still Saving All My Love For You" - EP's Trailer Park Scissors & Knives album (2009)
- "Crows, Raven & Rooks" - Dave Rotheray's The Life Of Birds album (2010)
- "Father Us" / "Secret Smile" - Marry Waterson & Oliver Knight The Days That Shaped Me album (2011)
- "Beyond The Sea" - The Café Sky1 TV series theme (2011)
- Chris Difford's Cashmere If You Can album (2011)
- "Kath With Rhodes" - James Yorkston I Was A Cat From A Book album (2012)
- "Julius You Still Care" / "A Simple Little Beat" - Ian McCutcheon & The Astral Rangers single (2012)
- "Hushabye" - Lisa Knapp Hidden Seam album (2013)
- "Answer Ballads" - Dave Rotheray album (2013)
- "Parliament Of Rooks" - Ed Harcourt Time Of Dust album (2014)
- "One Day At A Time" - Blue Rose Code Ballads Of Peckham Rye album (2014)
- "Alone" - Joy Of Living: A Tribute To Ewan MacColl album (2015)
- Beyond The Serenade - Alex Cornish album (2015)
- "I Can Hold You Back" - RM Hubbert Telling The Trees album (2016)
- Pieces - Michele Stodart album (2016)
- Fancy Pants - Chris Difford & Boo Hewerdine album (2016)

== Notable live appearances ==
- Tribute To Nick Drake, Barbican, London 25 September 1999
- Daughters Of Albion - Barbican, London 3 February 2006 (with Norma Waterson, June Tabor, Eliza Carthy, Sheila Chandra & Lou Rhodes)
- Once In A Blue Moon: A Tribute To Lal Waterson - Cecil Sharp House, London (with Eliza Carthy, Norma Waterson, James Yorkston & Martin Carthy)
- Rogues Gallery: Pirate Ballads, Sea Songs & Chanteys - Barbican, London 28 July 2008 (with Norma Waterson, Teddy Thompson, Eliza Carthy & Robyn Hitchcock)
- Twisted Christmas- Barbican, London 11 December 2008 (with Jarvis Cocker, Sandy Dillon, Neill MacColl, Frank Sidebottom, The Smoke Fairies & Mary Margaret O'Hara)
- Thompson Family Christmas, Queen Elizabeth Hall, London 17 December 2008 (with Linda Thompson, Richard Thompson, Teddy Thompson, Bert Jansch, Ed Harcourt, & The Unthanks)
- A Maritime Evening, Queen Elizabeth Hall, London (with Robyn Hitchcock, Graham Coxon, & KT Tunstall)
- Songs In the Key Of London -Barbican, London, 9 March 2010 (with Chris Difford, Suggs, Robyn Hitchcock, Jools Holland, Elvis Costello, Glenn Tilbrook & Chaz Jankel)
- Love & Other Crimes: The Songs Of Lee Hazlewood - Barbican, London - 25 October 2015 (with Ed Harcourt, Matthew E White, Josh T Pearson, Flo Morrissey & Fran Healy)
- Blood & Roses: A Tribute To Ewan MacColl, The Sage, Gateshead 5 November 2015 (with Peggy Seeger, Martin Carthy, Seth Lakeman, Eliza Carhy, Marry Waterson & The Unthanks)
- People Powered: Concert For Corbyn - Brighton Dome, Brighton 16 December 2016 ( with Paul Weller, Robert Wyatt, The Farm, Temples, Danny Thompson & Stealing Sheep )

=== TV appearances ===
- Never Mind The Buzzcocks, BBC2, UK 23 January 2003
- What Leonard Cohen Did For Me BBC4, UK (2004)
- Never Mind The Buzzcocks, BBC2, UK 5 December 2005
- Daughters Of Albion, BBC4 (2006)
- BBC Late Review, BBC2, UK (2009)
