= All You Can Eat =

All You Can Eat may refer to:

- All-you-can-eat restaurant, where a fixed price is paid for an unlimited amount of food
- All You Can Eat (k.d. lang album), 1995
- All You Can Eat (Beat Crusaders album)
- All You Can Eat (Left Lane Cruiser album)
- All You Can Eat (Steel Panther album), 2014
- All You Can Eat (Thunder album)
- All You Can Eat: Greed, Lust and the New Capitalism, a 2001 book by Linda McQuaig
- "All You Can Eat" (Adventure Time: Side Quests), a 2026 episode of Adventure Time: Side Quests
- "All You Can Eat" (The Cleveland Show), a 2012 episode of The Cleveland Show
- "All You Can Eat" (song), by Shonen Knife from Pop Tune, 2012
- All You Can Eat, an Alien Hominid minigame

== See also ==
- Eating Out: All You Can Eat, a 2009 film
