= List of Beck soundtracks =

The following is a list of the original soundtracks and singles from the Japanese manga series Beck, and its anime and live-action film adaptations.

== Songs ==
=== Beat Crusaders - Hit in the USA ===
The anime's opening theme song.

1. Beat Crusaders - Hit in the USA
2. Beat Crusaders - Super Collider
3. Beat Crusaders - B.A.D.

=== Meister - Above The Clouds ===
The anime's first ending theme song.

1. Meister - Above The Clouds
2. Meister - My World Down

=== Beat Crusaders - Moon on the Water ===
The anime's second ending theme song. Lyrics written by Sowelu. Was not released as an actual single.

1. Beat Crusaders - Moon on the Water

== Original soundtracks ==
=== Greatful Sound: Tribute to Beck ===
Greatful Sound: Tribute to Beck

Soundtrack album by Beck
- Released: November 15, 2002
- Genre: Soundtrack

Greatful Sound: Tribute to Beck was released as a promotional collectible for the Beck manga. The title "Greatful Sound" comes from the music festival featured in the series.

1. Choke Sleeper - Leave Me Alone
2. Nice Marbles - Furouto
3. Smorgas - Dead Man
4. Loop-Line - Flow
5. Badfish - Up Set Vibration
6. Beratrek with Poly-1 from Polysics - Let's Groove or Die
7. 54 Nude Honeys - Fat Liver
8. Bazra_{[ja]} - Yureru
9. Coaltar of the Deepers - h.s.k.s.
10. Rumtag - Melody

=== Beck: Animation Beck Soundtrack ===
Beck: Animation Beck Soundtrack

Soundtrack album by Beck
- Released: March 21, 2005
- Genre: Soundtrack
- Label: DefStar

Beck chronology
Beck: Animation Beck Soundtrack	Keith: Animation Beck Soundtrack

Beck: Animation Beck Soundtrack is the first soundtrack album for the anime adaptation of the Beck manga. It contains all the songs used in the anime (excluding instrumental background scores). Most of the music on this album was done by Beat Crusaders working with the characters' voice actors, but are credited to the series' fictional bands, such as Beck and The Dying Breed.

1. Beck - Brainstorm
2. Beck - Spice of Life
3. Chounaikaichuu no Musuko Band - Mad House
4. Maho Minami - Sly
5. Beck - Face
6. Belle Ame - Lost Melody
7. Rocket Boys - Follow Me
8. Kuniyoshi Chiemi - Genki wo Dashite
9. The Dying Breed feat. Yukio Tanaka - Moon on the Water
10. Beck - Like A Foojin
11. Ciel Bleu - Youkai Ningen Bem
12. Hyoudou Band - Gymnasium
13. Tsunemi Chiba - Reloaded
14. Musicmans feat. Manabu Miyazawa - Journey
15. Saitou San Band feat. Koyuki Tanaka & Maho Minami - Follow Me
16. The Dying Breed - My World Down
17. Hyoudou Band 2 - Love Dischord
18. Beck - By Her
19. Beck - I've Got a Feeling (The Beatles cover)
20. Beck - Slip Out
21. Koyuki Tanaka & Maho Minami - Moon on the Water
22. The Pillows - Last Dinosaur (Ep. 26 - The Heroes band with Taira)

=== Keith: Animation Beck Soundtrack ===
Keith: Animation Beck Soundtrack

Soundtrack album by Beck
- Released: March 21, 2005
- Genre: Soundtrack
- Label: DefStar

Beck chronology
Beck: Animation Beck Soundtrack	Keith: Animation Beck Soundtrack

Keith: Animation Beck Soundtrack is the second soundtrack album for the anime adaptation of the Beck manga. It contains the hit songs from the first soundtrack in their original forms, prior to the anime's covers of them.

1. Typhoon24 feat. Tatsuzo of YKZ - Spice of Life
2. Tropical Gorilla - Big Muff
3. Up Hold - Endless Traveling Map
4. Goofy's Holiday - Piece of Tears
5. Typhoon24 Feat. Tatsuzo of YKZ - Like a Foojin
6. Goofy's Holiday - Journey
7. Beat Crusaders - 50¢ Wisdom
8. Husking Bee - Brightest
9. Sister - Face
10. Meister - I Call You Love
11. 10-Feet - Little More Than Before
12. Beat Crusaders - Moon on the Water

=== Beck the Movie: Official Inspired By... ===
Beck the Movie: Official Inspired By...

Compilation album by Beck
- Released: August 25, 2010
- Genre: Soundtrack
- Label: Sony Music Entertainment

Beck the Movie: Official Inspired By... is a compilation album of songs said to "express the worldview" of the Beck manga.

1. Oasis - Don't Look Back in Anger
2. Rage Against the Machine - Guerrilla Radio
3. The Offspring - Come Out and Play
4. The Clash - I Fought the Law
5. The Black Crowes - Remedy
6. Alice in Chains - Man in the Box
7. Travis - Why Does It Always Rain on Me?
8. Manic Street Preachers - Motorcycle Emptiness
9. Lauryn Hill - Doo Wop (That Thing)
10. Bob Dylan - Subterranean Homesick Blues
11. Kula Shaker - Hush
12. Fiona Apple - Criminal
13. Jimi Hendrix - All Along the Watchtower
14. Janis Joplin - Move Over
15. Jeff Buckley - Hallelujah
16. Oasis / I Am the Walrus (Live)

=== Beck: The Movie Soundtrack ===
Beck: The Movie Soundtrack

Soundtrack album by Beck
- Released: September 15, 2010
- Genre: Soundtrack
- Label: Sony Music Entertainment

Beck: The Movie Soundtrack is the soundtrack album for the live-action film adaptation of the Beck manga. Almost all of the songs are instrumental.

1. Kotringo - Koyuki
2. Suble - Wait a Minute
3. Robert Gabriel - The Promise
4. Kotringo - Dash
5. Robert Gabriel - The Contact
6. Yamaruku Manchester - Maho's Ringtone
7. Shigekazu Aida - Charlie Don't Surf
8. Takeshi Shibuya feat. Curly Giraffe - Candy Girl
9. Robert Gabriel - Sudden Attack
10. Suble - Day Labor Blues
11. Suble - Fist of Fury
12. Kotringo - Koyuki and Saku
13. Suble - Large Global Expansion Strategy
14. Kotringo - Kiss~School
15. Robert Gabriel - Burned Pride
16. Yassy - Now on Sale
17. Robert Gabriel - The Whole Beginning
18. Kotringo - Triangle
19. Robert Gabriel - Bad Feelings
20. Robert Gabriel - The Abducted
21. Kotringo - Taikukanmae
22. Robert Gabriel - The Rapper's Grief
23. Kotringo - Passing
24. Robert Gabriel - Let the Battle Begin
25. Robert Gabriel - The Fight for no Return
26. Kotringo - The Stage
27. Kotringo - Koyuki and Maho
