= J-pop =

Japanese popular music genre

- Stylistic origins: Pop; rock; group sounds; crossover
- Cultural origins: Nominally 1980s–early 1990s Japan; Roots traced to the 1960s–1970s
- Derivative forms: Anime song; Japanese hip-hop; Lo-Fi

Subgenres
- City pop; J-Euro; technopop

Fusion genres
- Kawaii metal

Regional scenes
- Shibuya-kei

Other topics
- Enka; image song; Japanese idol; Japanese rock; Para Para; Super Eurobeat; Vocaloid

J-pop (an abbreviated form of "Japanese popular music") is a form of popular music that entered the musical mainstream of Japan in the 1990s. In Japan it is known simply as pops (ポップス, poppusu). Modern J-pop has its roots in traditional music of Japan, and global 1960s pop and rock music. J-pop replaced kayōkyoku ("Lyric Singing Music"), a term for Japanese popular music from the 1920s to the 1980s in the Japanese music scene.

Japanese rock bands such as Happy End fused the Beatles and Beach Boys-style rock with Japanese music in the 1960s–1970s. J-pop was further defined by new wave and crossover fusion acts of the late 1970s, such as Yellow Magic Orchestra and Southern All Stars. Popular styles of Japanese pop music include city pop and technopop during the 1970s–1980s, and J-Euro (such as Namie Amuro) and Shibuya-kei during the 1990s and 2000s.

Japanese country had popularity during the international popularity of Westerns in the 1960s–1970s as well, and it still has appeal due to the work of musicians like Charlie Nagatani and Tomi Fujiyama, along with venues like Little Texas in Tokyo. Japanese hip-hop became mainstream with producer Nujabes during the 1990s–2000s, especially his work on Samurai Champloo, and Japanese pop culture is often seen with anime in hip-hop. In addition, Latin music, CCM, and gospel music have scenes within J-pop.

== Form and definition ==
The origin of modern J-pop is said to be Japanese-language rock music inspired by the likes of The Beatles. Unlike the Japanese music genre called kayōkyoku, J-pop uses a special kind of pronunciation, which is similar to that of English. One notable singer to do so is Keisuke Kuwata, who pronounced the Japanese word karada ("body") as kyerada. Additionally, unlike Western music, the major second (sol and la) was usually not used in Japanese music, except art music, before rock music became popular in Japan. When the Group Sounds genre, which was inspired by Western rock, became popular, Japanese pop music adopted the major second, which was used in the final sounds of The Beatles' song "I Want to Hold Your Hand" and The Rolling Stones' song "(I Can't Get No) Satisfaction". Although Japanese pop music changed from music based on Japanese pentatonic scale and distortional tetrachord to the more occidental music over time, music that drew from the traditional Japanese singing style remained popular (such as that of Ringo Sheena).

At first, the term J-pop was used only for Western-style musicians in Japan, such as Pizzicato Five and Flipper's Guitar, just after Japanese radio station J-Wave was established. On the other hand, Mitsuhiro Hidaka of AAA from Avex Trax said that J-pop was originally derived from the Eurobeat genre. However, the term became a blanket term, covering other music genres—such as the majority of Japanese rock music of the 1990s.

In 1990, the Japanese subsidiary of Tower Records defined J-pop as all Japanese music belonging to the Recording Industry Association of Japan except Japanese independent music (which they term "J-indie"); their stores began to use additional classifications, such as J-club, J-punk, J-hip-hop, J-reggae, J-anime, and Visual kei by 2008, after independent musicians started to release works via major labels. Ito Music City, a Japanese record store, adopted expanded classifications including Group Sounds, idol of the 1970s–1980s, enka, folk and established musicians of the 1970s–1980s, in addition to the main J-pop genres.

Whereas rock musicians in Japan usually hate the term "pop", Taro Kato, a member of pop-punk band Beat Crusaders, pointed out that the encoded pop music, like pop art, was catchier than "J-pop" and he also said that J-pop was the pops (ポップス, poppusu) music, memorable for its frequency of airplay, in an interview when the band completed their first full-length studio album under a major label, P.O.A.: Pop on Arrival, in 2005. Because the band did not want to perform J-pop music, their album featured the 1980s Pop of MTV. According to his fellow band member Toru Hidaka, the 1990s music that influenced him (such as Nirvana, Hi-Standard, and Flipper's Guitar) was not listened typically to by fans of other music in Japan at that time.

In contrast to this, although many Japanese rock musicians until the late 1980s disrespected the kayōkyoku music, many of Japanese rock bands of the 1990s—such as Glay—assimilated kayōkyoku into their music. After the late 1980s, breakbeat and samplers also changed the Japanese music scene, where expert drummers had played good rhythm because traditional Japanese music did not have the rhythm based on rock or blues.

Hide of Greeeen openly described their music genre as J-pop. He said, "I also love rock, hip hop and breakbeats, but my field is consistently J-pop. For example, hip hop musicians learn 'the culture of hip hop' when they begin their career. We are not like those musicians and we love the music as sounds very much. Those professional people may say 'What are you doing?' but I think that our musical style is cool after all. The good thing is good."

One term recently coined in relation to "J-pop" is gacha pop (ガチャポップ, gachapoppu) coming from the industry's association with other popular cultures within Japan that has gained international attention like city pop, anisong, Vocaloids and VTubing.

== History ==
=== 1920s–1960s: Ryūkōka ===
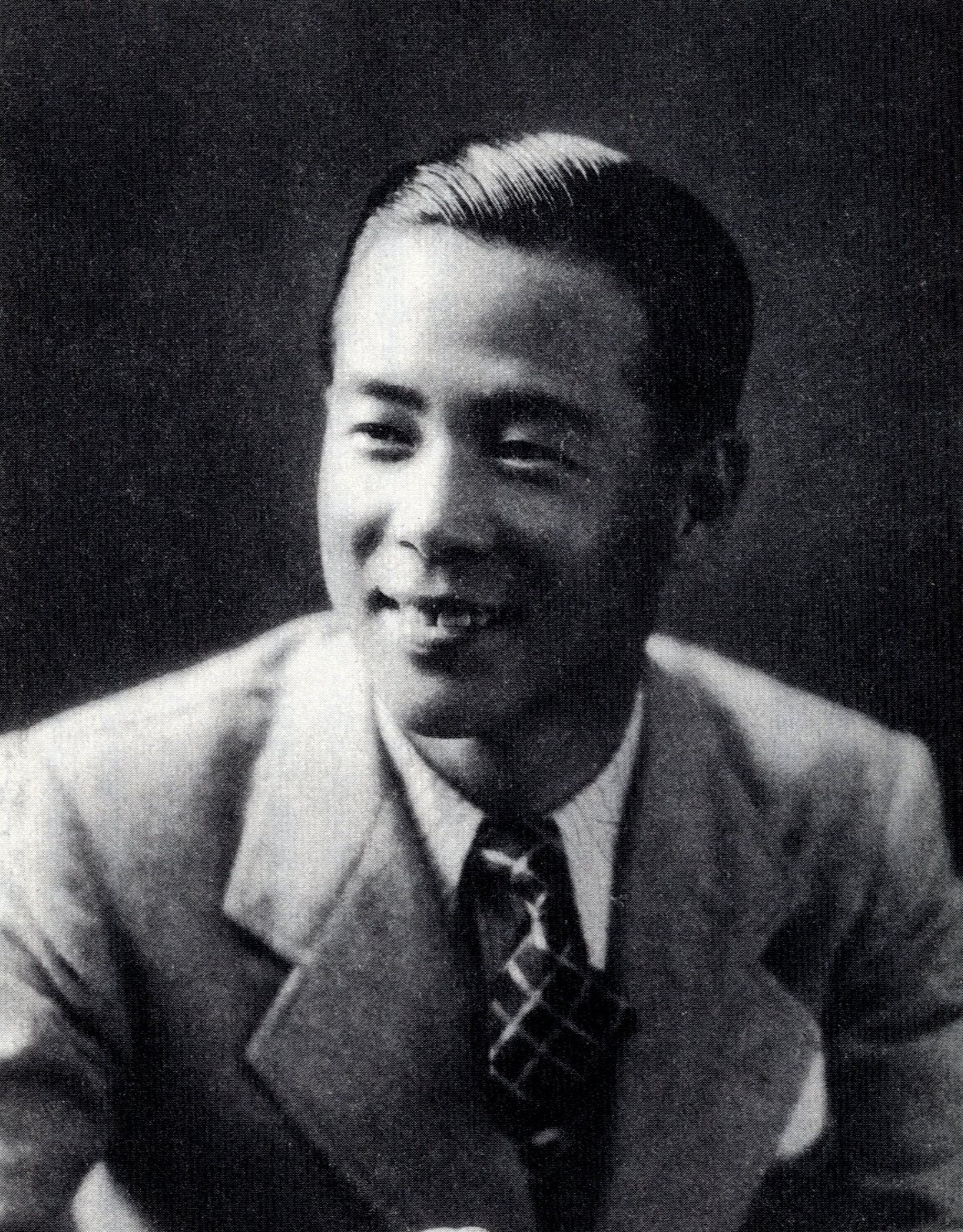
Ichiro Fujiyama, influential ryūkōka singer

Japanese popular music, called ryūkōka before being split into enka and poppusu, has origins in the Meiji period, but most Japanese scholars consider the Taishō period to be the actual starting point of ryūkōka, as it is the era in which the genre first gained nationwide popularity. By the Taishō period, Western musical techniques and instruments, which had been introduced to Japan in the Meiji period, were widely used. Influenced by Western genres such as jazz and blues, ryūkōka incorporated Western instruments such as the violin, harmonica, and guitar. However, the melodies were often written according to the traditional Japanese pentatonic scale. In the 1930s, Ichiro Fujiyama released popular songs with his tenor voice. Fujiyama sang songs with a lower volume than opera through the microphone (the technique is sometimes called crooning).

Jazz musician Ryoichi Hattori attempted to produce Japanese native music which had a "flavor" of blues. He composed Noriko Awaya's hit song "Wakare no Blues" (lit. "Farewell Blues"). Awaya became a famous popular singer and was called "Queen of Blues" in Japan. Due to pressure from the Imperial Army during the war, the performance of jazz music was temporarily halted in Japan. Hattori, who stayed in Shanghai at the end of the war, produced hit songs such as Shizuko Kasagi's "Tokyo Boogie-Woogie" and Ichiro Fujiyama's "Aoi Sanmyaku" (lit. "Blue Mountain Range"). Hattori later became known as the "Father of Japanese poppusu". Boogie-woogie, Mambo, Blues, and Country music were performed by Japanese musicians for the American troops. Chiemi Eri's cover song "Tennessee Waltz" (1952), Hibari Misora's "Omatsuri Mambo" (1952), and Izumi Yukimura's cover song "Till I Waltz Again with You" (1953) also became popular. Foreign musicians and groups, including JATP and Louis Armstrong, visited Japan to perform. In the mid-1950s, Jazz kissa (ジャズ喫茶, Jazu Kissa, literally "Jazz cafe") became a popular venue for live jazz music. Jazz had a large impact on Japanese poppusu, though "authentic" jazz did not become the mainstream genre of music in Japan. In the late 1950s and early 1960s, Japanese pop was polarized between urban kayō and modern enka.

Modern J-pop is also sometimes believed to have had its roots with Chinese immigrant jazz musicians who had fled Shanghai during the communist takeover, and were collaborating with American soldiers to help introduce a variety of new genres to the Japanese public. In 1949, when the communists took over and established the People's Republic of China on the mainland, one of the first actions taken by the government was to denounce popular music (specifically both Chinese pop music, known as Mandopop, and Western pop music) as decadent music, and for decades afterwards the Communist Party would promote Chinese revolutionary songs while suppressing Chinese folk songs, Chinese pop songs and Western pop songs. Dissatisfied with Chairman Mao Zedong's new music policies, a number of Shanghainese jazz musicians fled to the British colony of Hong Kong and established Cantopop, which is pop music sung in Cantonese. However, a few musicians instead settled in Japan, where they became members of the Far East Network and collaborated with the American soldiers to help expose the Japanese public to a wide variety of western genres. This eventually lead to the establishment of modern Japanese pop music, known as kayōkyoku.

=== 1960s: Origin of modern style ===
==== Rokabirī Boom and Wasei pops ====
During the 1950s and 60s, yakuza manager Kazuo Taoka reorganized the concert touring industry by treating the performers as professionals. Many of these performers later became key participants in the J-pop genre.

In 1956, Japan's rock and roll craze began, due to the country music group known as Kosaka Kazuya and the Wagon Masters; their rendition of Elvis Presley's song "Heartbreak Hotel" helped to fuel the trend. The music was called "rockabilly" (or rokabirī) by the Japanese media. Performers learned to play the music and translate the lyrics of popular American songs, resulting in the birth of Cover Pops (カヴァーポップス, Kavā poppusu). The rockabilly movement would reach its peak when 45,000 people saw the performances by Japanese singers at the first Nichigeki Western Carnival in one week of February 1958.

Kyu Sakamoto, a fan of Elvis, made his stage début as a member of the band The Drifters at the Nichigeki Western Carnival in 1958. His 1961 song "Ue wo Muite Arukō" ("Let's Look Up and Walk"), known in other parts of the world as "Sukiyaki", was released to the United States in 1963. It was the first Japanese song to reach the Number One position in the United States, spending four weeks in Cash Box and three weeks in Billboard. It also received a gold record for selling one million copies. During this period, female duo The Peanuts also became popular, singing a song in the movie Mothra. Their songs, such as "Furimukanaide" ("Don't Turn Around") were later covered by Candies on their album Candy Label. Artists like Kyu Sakamoto and The Peanuts were called Wasei Pops (和製ポップス, Wasei poppusu; "Japan-made pop").

After frequently changing members, Chosuke Ikariya re-formed The Drifters in 1964 under the same name. At a Beatles concert in 1966, they acted as curtain raisers, but the audience generally objected. Eventually, The Drifters became popular in Japan, releasing "Zundoko-Bushi" ("Echoic word tune") in 1969. Along with enka singer Keiko Fuji, they won "the award for mass popularity" at the 12th Japan Record Awards in 1970. Keiko Fuji's 1970 album Shinjuku no Onna/'Enka no Hoshi' Fuji Keiko no Subete ("Woman in Shinjuku/'Star of Enka' All of Keiko Fuji") established an all-time record in the history of the Japanese Oricon chart by staying in the Number One spot for 20 consecutive weeks. The Drifters later came to be known as television personalities and invited idols such as Momoe Yamaguchi and Candies to their television program.

==== Ereki boom and group sounds ====
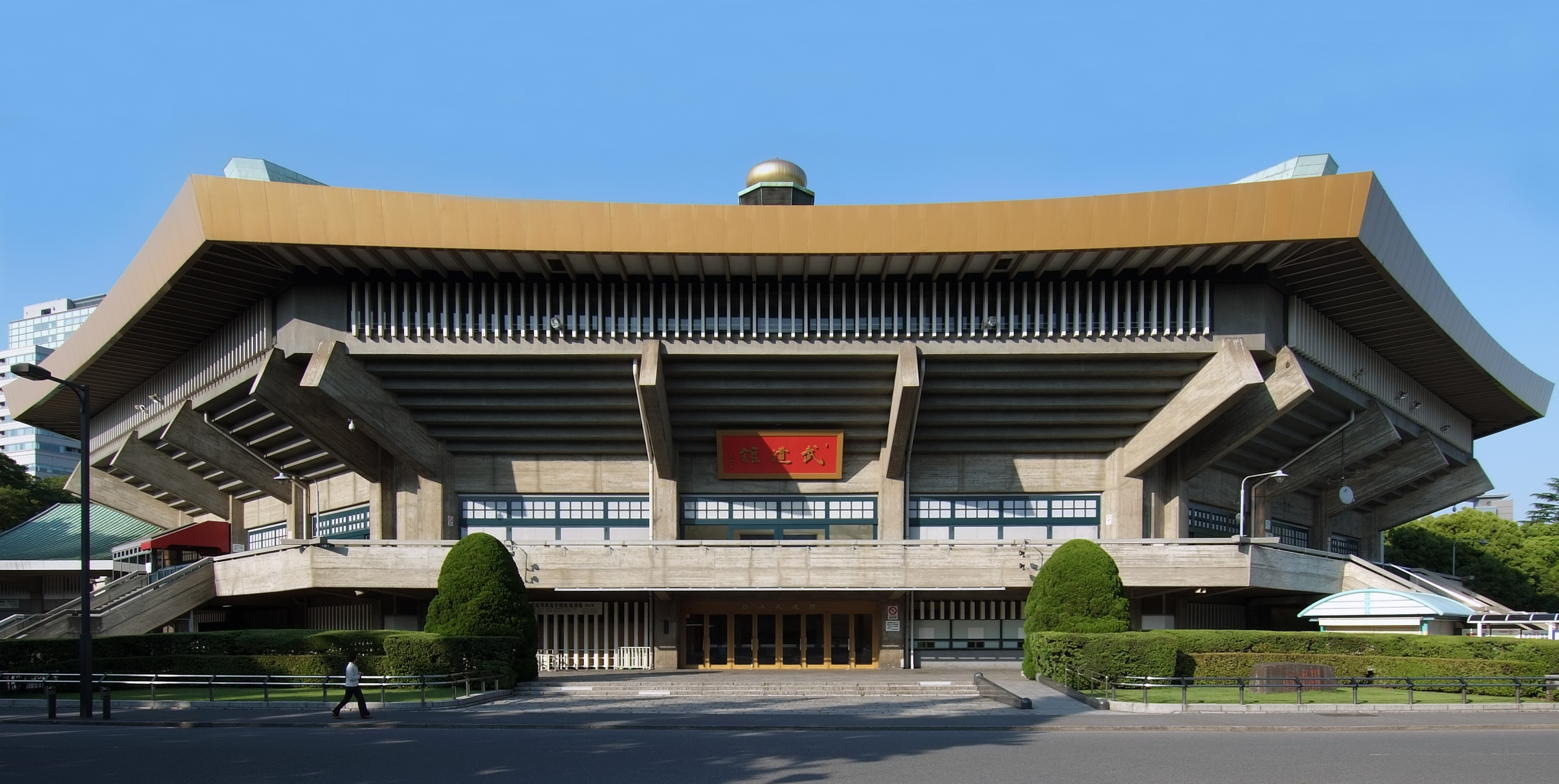
Nippon Budokan, legendary place for Japanese musicians

The Ventures visited Japan in 1962, causing the widespread embrace of the electric guitar called the "Ereki boom". Yūzō Kayama and Takeshi Terauchi became famous players of electric guitar. In 1966, the Beatles came to Japan and sang their songs at the Nippon Budokan, becoming the first rock music band to perform a concert there. The public believed that the Beatles would cause juvenile delinquency. The Japanese government deployed riot police against young rock fans at the Nippon Budokan. John Lennon felt that they were not well regarded in Japan, but Beatlemania has never really died there. The Beatles inspired Japanese bands, creating the group sounds genre in Japan.

Most Japanese musicians felt that they could not sing rock in Japanese, so the popularity of Japanese rock gradually declined. As a result, there were debates such as "Should we sing rock music in Japanese?" and "Should we sing in English?" between Happy End and Yuya Uchida about Japanese rock music. This confrontation was called "Japanese-language rock controversy" (日本語ロック論争, Nihongo Rokku Ronsō). Happy End proved that rock music could be sung in Japanese, and one theory holds that their music became one of the origins of modern J-pop. The Beatles also inspired Eikichi Yazawa, who grew up in an underprivileged family, his father dying when he was a child. Keisuke Kuwata, who grew up in a dual-income family, was influenced by the Beatles through his older sister, then an avid fan. Yōsui Inoue was also a fan of The Beatles, but he said that his music style was not particularly related to them. After Happy End disbanded in 1973, Haruomi Hosono, a former member, began a solo career and later formed Yellow Magic Orchestra.

=== 1970s: Development of "new music" ===
==== Fōku and new music ====
In the early 1960s, some Japanese music became influenced by the American folk music revival; this was called fōku (フォーク; "folk"), although the genre of music was mostly covers of original songs. In the late 1960s, the Folk Crusaders became famous and the underground music around that time became called fōku. As with enka, Japanese fōku singers Wataru Takada performed social satires.

In the early 1970s, the emphasis shifted from fōku's simple songs with a single guitar accompaniment to more complex musical arrangements known as new music (ニューミュージック, nyū myūjikku). Instead of social messages, the songs focused on more personal messages, such as love. In 1972, singer-songwriter Takuro Yoshida produced a hit song "Kekkon Shiyouyo" ("Let's marry") without decent television promotion, though fans of fōku music became very angry because his music seemed to be a low effort or low quality form of music. The highest-selling single of the year was the enka song by Shiro Miya and the Pinkara Trio, "Onna no Michi". The song eventually sold over 3.25 million copies. On December 1, 1973, Yōsui Inoue released the album Kōri no Sekai, which topped the Oricon charts and remained in Top 10 for 113 weeks. It spent 13 consecutive weeks in the number-one spot, and eventually established a still-standing record of a total 35 weeks at the number-one position on the Oricon charts. Yumi Matsutoya, formerly known by her maiden name Yumi Arai, also became a notable singer-songwriter during this period In October 1975, she released a single "Ano Hi ni Kaeritai" ("I want to return to that day"), making it her first number-one single on the Oricon charts. Miyuki Nakajima, Amii Ozaki, and Junko Yagami were also popular singer-songwriters during this period. At first, only Yumi Matsutoya was commonly called a new music artist, but the concept of Japanese fōku music changed around that time. In 1979, Chage and Aska made their debut, and folk band Off Course (with singer Kazumasa Oda) released a hit song "Sayonara" ("Good-bye").

Saki Kubota was described as the standard bearer of new music.

==== Emergence of Japanese rock and electronic music ====
Rock music remained a relatively underground music genre in the early 1970s in Japan, though Happy End managed to gain mainstream success fusing rock with traditional Japanese music. Several Japanese musicians began experimenting with electronic music, including electronic rock. The most notable was the internationally renowned Isao Tomita, whose 1972 album Electric Samurai: Switched on Rock featured electronic synthesizer renditions of contemporary rock and pop songs. Other early examples of electronic rock records include Inoue Yousui's folk rock and pop rock album Ice World (1973) and Osamu Kitajima's progressive psychedelic rock album Benzaiten (1974), both of which involved contributions from Haruomi Hosono, who later started the electronic music group "Yellow Magic Band" (later known as Yellow Magic Orchestra) in 1977.

In 1978, Eikichi Yazawa's rock single "Jikan yo Tomare" ("Time, Stop") became a smash hit that sold over 639,000 copies. He is regarded as one of the pioneers of Japanese rock. He sought worldwide success, and in 1980 he signed a contract with the Warner Pioneer record company and moved to the West Coast of the United States. He recorded the albums Yazawa, It's Just Rock n' Roll, and Flash in Japan, all of which were released worldwide, but were not very commercially successful. Keisuke Kuwata formed the rock band Southern All Stars (SAS), which made their debut in 1978. Southern All Stars remains very popular in Japan today.

In the same year, Yellow Magic Orchestra (YMO) also made their official debut with their self-titled album. The band, whose members were Haruomi Hosono, Yukihiro Takahashi and Ryuichi Sakamoto, developed electropop, or technopop as it is known in Japan, in addition to pioneering synthpop and electro music. Their 1979 album Solid State Survivor reached number one on the Oricon charts in July 1980, and went on to sell two million records worldwide. At around the same time, the YMO albums Solid State Survivor and X∞Multiplies held both the top two spots on the Oricon charts for seven consecutive weeks, making YMO the only band in Japanese chart history to achieve this feat. Young fans of their music during this period became known as the "YMO Generation" (YMO世代, YMO sedai). YMO had a significant impact on Japanese pop music, which started becoming increasingly dominated by electronic music due to their influence, and they had an equally large impact on electronic music across the world. Southern All Stars and Yellow Magic Orchestra symbolized the end of New Music and paved the way for the emergence of the J-pop genre in the 1980s. Both bands, SAS and YMO, would later be ranked at the top of HMV's list of top 100 Japanese musicians of all time.

=== 1980s: Fusion with "kayōkyoku" ===
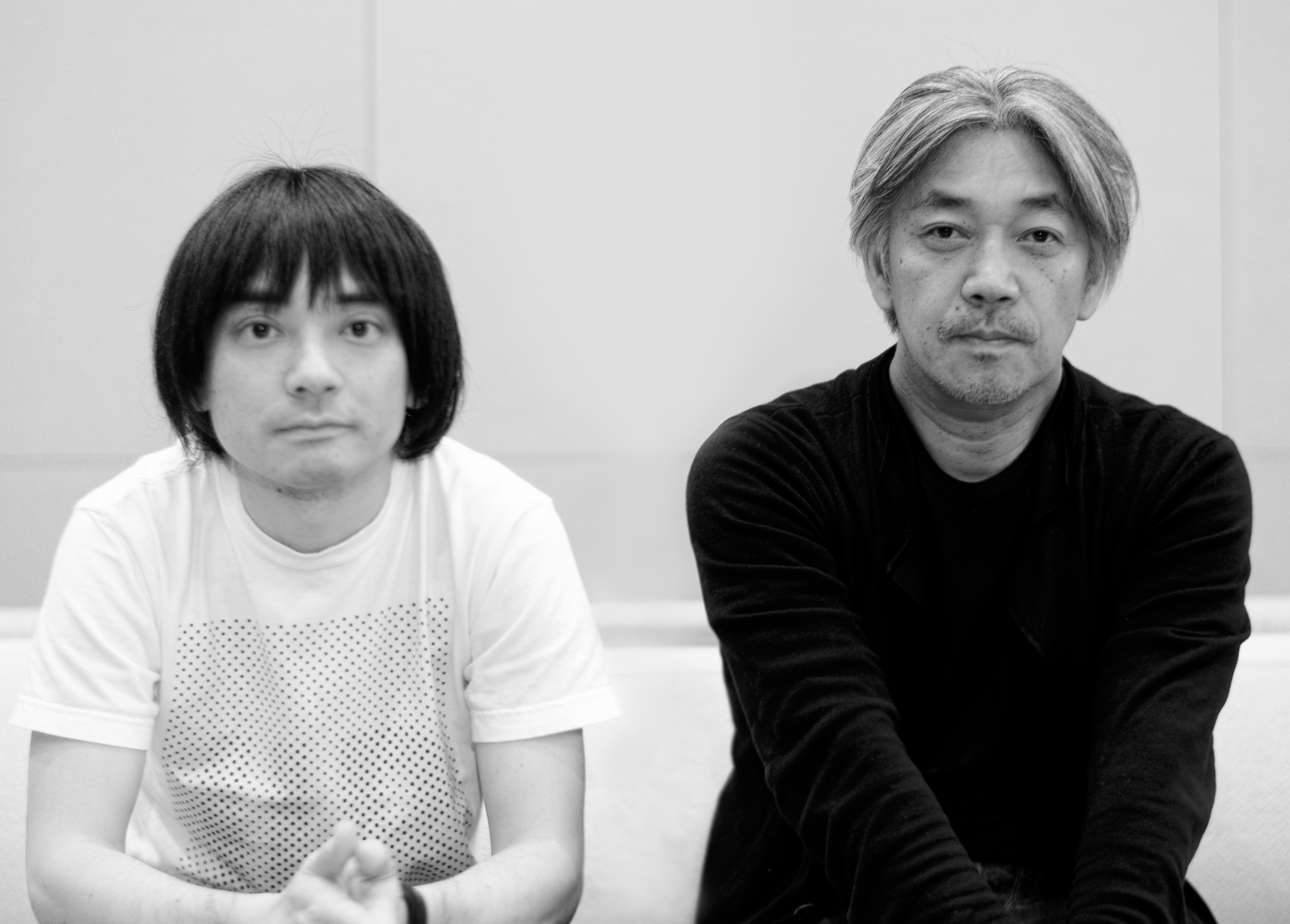
Shibuya-kei artist Keigo Oyamada (left) with YMO member Ryuichi Sakamoto

==== City pop ====
In the early 1980s, with the spread of car stereos, the term city pop (シティーポップ, shitī poppu) came to describe a type of popular music that had a big city theme. Tokyo in particular inspired many songs of this form. During this time, music fans and artists in Japan were influenced by album-oriented rock (especially adult contemporary) and crossover (especially jazz fusion). City pop was affected by new music, though its origins have been traced back to the mid-1970s, with the work of the Japanese rock band Happy End and its former member Haruomi Hosono, as well as Tatsuro Yamashita.

The popularity of city pop plummeted when the Japanese asset price bubble burst in 1990. Its musical characteristics (except its "cultural background") were inherited by 1990s Shibuya-kei musicians such as Pizzicato Five and Flipper's Guitar.

==== Growth of the Japanese rock industry ====
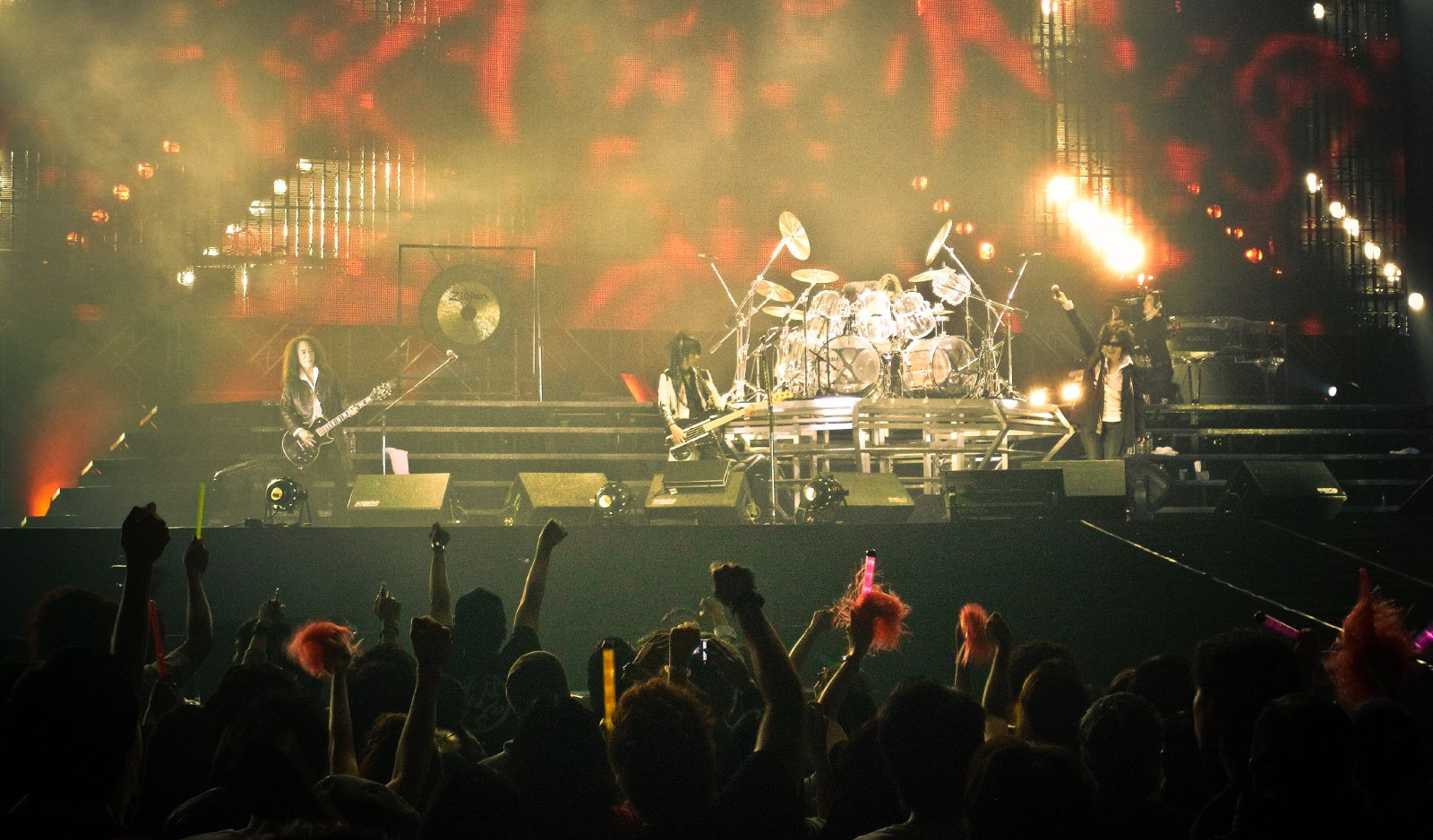
Concert of pioneer of visual kei, X Japan at Hong Kong in 2009 after their 2007 reunion

Throughout the 1980s, rock bands such as Southern All Stars, RC Succession, Anzen Chitai, The Checkers, The Alfee, and The Blue Hearts became popular. Anzen Chitai came from Yosui Inoue's backup band. On December 1, 1983, rock singer Yutaka Ozaki debuted at the age of 18. In 1986, The Alfee became the first artists to play a concert in front of an audience of 100,000 people in Japan. Some Japanese musicians, such as Boøwy, TM Network, and Buck-Tick, were influenced by New Romanticism.

Boøwy became an especially influential rock band, whose members included singer Kyosuke Himuro and guitarist Tomoyasu Hotei. Their three albums reached number one in 1988, making them the first male artists to have three number-ones within a single year. Subsequent Japanese rock bands were modeled on this band. Guitarist Tak Matsumoto, who supported TM Network's concerts, formed rock duo B'z with singer Koshi Inaba in 1988.

In the late 1980s, girl band Princess Princess became a successful pop-rock band. Their singles "Diamonds" and "Sekai de Ichiban Atsui Natsu" ("World's Hottest Summer") were ranked at the number-one and number-two spots, respectively, on the 1989 Oricon Yearly Single Charts.

In the late 1980s, a new trend also emerged in Japanese rock music: the visual kei, a movement notable by male bands who wore makeup, extravagant hair styles, and androgynous costumes. The most successful representatives of the movement are X Japan (formerly known as "X") and Buck-Tick. X Japan released their first album Vanishing Vision on the indie label Extasy Records in 1988; their album Blue Blood was released on CBS Sony in 1989. Blue Blood sold 712,000 copies, and their 1991 album Jealousy sold over 1.11 million copies. Surprisingly, X Japan were a heavy metal band, but guitarist hide later came under the influence of alternative rock, releasing his first solo album Hide Your Face in 1994 and launching his successful solo career.

==== Golden age, decline and transfiguration of Idols ====
In the 1970s, the popularity of female idol singers such as Mari Amachi, Saori Minami, Momoe Yamaguchi, and Candies increased. Momoe Yamaguchi was one of the first kayōkyoku singers to use the special pronunciation characteristic of J-pop. In 1972, Hiromi Go made his debut with the song "Otokonoko Onnanoko" ("Boy and Girl"). Hiromi Go originally came from Johnny & Associates. In 1976, female duo Pink Lady made their debut with the single "Pepper Keibu". They released a record nine consecutive number-one singles.

In the 1980s, Japanese idols inherited New Music, though the term fell out of usage. Seiko Matsuda especially adopted song producers of previous generations. In 1980, her third single "Kaze wa Aki Iro" ("Wind is autumn color") reached the number-one spot on the Oricon charts. Haruomi Hosono also joined the production of her music. She eventually became the first artist to make 24 consecutive number-one singles, breaking Pink Lady's record. Other female idol singers achieved significant popularity in the 1980s, such as Akina Nakamori, Yukiko Okada, Kyōko Koizumi, Yoko Minamino, Momoko Kikuchi, Yōko Oginome, Miho Nakayama, Minako Honda, and Chisato Moritaka. Okada received the Best New Artist award from the Japan Record Awards in 1984. Nakamori won the Grand Prix award for two consecutive years (1985 and 1986), also at the Japan Record Awards. Japanese idol band Onyanko Club made their debut in 1985, and produced popular singer Shizuka Kudō. They changed the image of Japanese idols.

Around 1985, however, people began to be disenchanted with the system for creating idols. In 1986, idol singer Yukiko Okada's song "Kuchibiru Network" ("Lips' Network"), written by Seiko Matsuda and composed by Ryuichi Sakamoto, became a hit song, but she committed suicide immediately after that. Hikaru Genji, one of the Johnny & Associates bands, made their debut in 1987. They became a highly influential rollerskating boy band, with some of their members gaining their own fame as they got older. Their song "Paradise Ginga", written by Aska, won the Grand Prix award at the 30th Japan Record Awards in 1988. Some of the group's backing dancers later formed SMAP. The late 1980s also saw the rise of the female duo Wink. They did not laugh, unlike Japanese idols of former eras. Wink debuted in 1988, surpassing the popularity of the then-most popular female duo, BaBe. Wink's song "Samishii Nettaigyo" won the grand prix award at the 31st Japan Record Awards in 1989.

Popular singer Hibari Misora died in 1989, and many kayōkyoku programs, such as The Best Ten, were closed. CoCo made their hit debut with the 1989 single "Equal Romance" for the hit anime series Ranma ½. Tetsuya Komuro, a member of TM Network, broke Seiko Matsuda's streak of 25 consecutive number-ones by making his single "Gravity of Love" to debut at number-one in November 1989.

=== 1990s: Coining of the term "J-pop" ===
==== 1990–1997: Growing market ====
In the 1990s, the term J-pop came to refer to all Japanese popular songs except enka. During this period, the Japanese music industry sought marketing effectiveness. Notable examples of commercial music from the era were the tie-in music from the agency Being and the follow-on, Tetsuya Komuro's disco music. The period between around 1990 and 1993 was dominated by artists from the Being agency, including B'z, Tube, B.B.Queens, T-Bolan, Zard, Wands, Maki Ohguro, Deen, and Field of View. They were called the Being System (ビーイング系, Bīingu kei). Many of those artists topped the charts and established new records, notably B'z, which eventually established a new record for consecutive number-one singles, surpassing Seiko Matsuda's record. B'z is the Japanese biggest selling artist of all time, according to Oricon charts and RIAJ certifications. On the other hand, Wands, regarded as a pioneer of the "J-pop Boom" of the 1990s, had trouble because member Show Wesugi wanted to play alternative rock/grunge.

Many artists surpassed the two-million-copy mark in the 1990s. Kazumasa Oda's 1991 single "Oh! Yeah!/Love Story wa Totsuzen ni", Chage and Aska's 1991 single "Say Yes" and 1993 single "Yah Yah Yah", Kome Kome Club's 1992 single "Kimi ga Iru Dake de", Mr. Children's 1994 single "Tomorrow Never Knows" and 1996 single "Namonaki Uta", and Globe's 1996 single "Departures" are examples of songs that sold more than 2 million copies. Dreams Come True's 1992 album The Swinging Star became the first album to sell over 3 million copies in Japan. Mr. Children's 1994 album Atomic Heart established a new record, selling 3.43 million copies on Oricon charts. The duo Chage and Aska, who started recording in late 1979, became very popular during this period. They released a string of consecutive hits throughout the early 1990s; in 1996, they took part in MTV Unplugged, making them the first Asian group to do so.

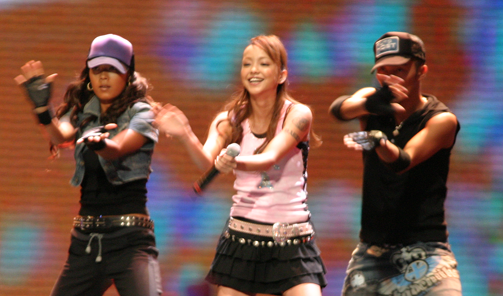
Namie Amuro (center) performs at MTV Asia Aid in Bangkok, Thailand in 2005.

After TM Network disbanded in 1994, Tetsuya Komuro became a serious song producer. The period between 1994 and 1997 was dominated by dance and techno acts from the "Komuro family" (小室ファミリー, Komuro Famirī), such as TRF, Ryoko Shinohara, Yuki Uchida, Namie Amuro, Hitomi, Globe, Tomomi Kahala, and Ami Suzuki. In that time, Komuro was responsible for 20 hit songs, each selling more than a million copies. While Globe's 1996 album Globe sold 4.13 million copies, establishing a record at the time, Namie Amuro's 1997 song "Can You Celebrate?" sold 2.29 million copies, is the best selling single of all time by the female solo artist in the history of Jpop. His total sales as a song producer reached 170 million copies. By 1998, Komuro's songs had become less popular. By the middle part of the first decade of the 21st century, Komuro's debt lead him to attempt the sale of his song catalog—which he did not actually own—to an investor. When the investor found out and sued, Komuro tried to sell the catalog to another investor in order to pay the 600,000,000 Japanese yen judgement he owed the first investor.

Namie Amuro, who was arguably the most popular solo singer in the period, came from the "Okinawa Actors School", which also incubated the bands MAX and Speed. At first, while still a part of the Komuro Family, Amuro remained in the dance music genre, but she slowly changed her music style to contemporary R&B and ended her partnership with Tetsuya Komuro. Komuro's band Globe became a trance band after their 2001 album Outernet.

==== 1997–1999: Commercial peak ====
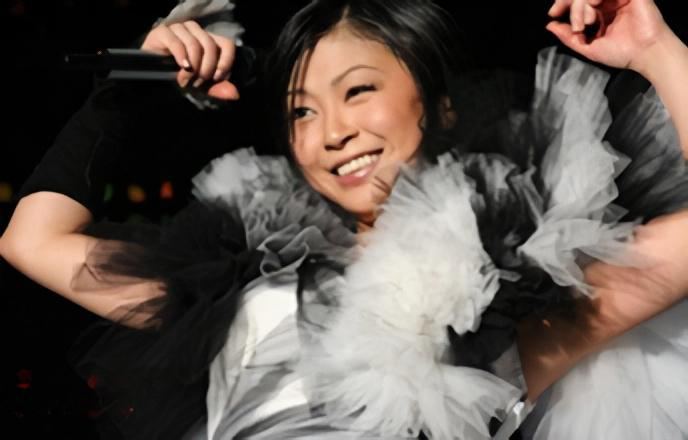
Hikaru Utada debuted in 1998.

The sales in the Japanese music market continued to increase. In October 1997, Glay released their album Review -The Best of Glay, which sold 4.87 million copies, breaking Globe's earlier record. However, it was surpassed in the next year by B'z's album B'z The Best "Pleasure", which sold 5.12 million copies. The Japanese market for physical music sales peaked in 1998, recording sales of ¥607,000,000,000. In March 1999, Hikaru Utada released her first Japanese album, First Love, which sold 7.65 million copies, making it the best-selling album in Oricon history.

The late 1990s saw the popularity of rock bands, such as Glay, Luna Sea, and L'Arc-en-Ciel, most of them related to the visual kei movement, though they later changed their style. At the time, rock musicians in Japan were absorbing kayōkyoku music after the genre vanished. Glay became especially successful, with massive exposure in the media, comparable to that of the most popular pop singers produced by Tetsuya Komuro. In July 1999, Glay played a concert to a record audience of 200,000 people at the Makuhari Messe, certified by Guinness World Records as the biggest solo concert in Japan. In July 1999, L'Arc-en-Ciel released two albums, Arc and Ray, at the same time; they sold over 3.02 million combined copies in the first week of release.

X Japan announced their disbandment in September 1997 and their guitarist hide died in May 1998. His funeral had a record attendance of 50,000 people, breaking the record of Hibari Misora, whose funeral was attended by 42,000 people. After his death, his single "Pink Spider" and album Ja, Zoo were certified million-sellers by the Recording Industry Association of Japan.

Johnny & Associates produced many all-male groups: SMAP, Tokio, V6, KinKi Kids and Arashi. SMAP hit the J-pop scene in a major way in the 1990s through a combination of TV "Tarento" shows and singles, with one of its singers, Takuya Kimura, becoming a popular actor commonly known as "Kimutaku" in later years.

By the late 1990s, the girl group Speed was very popular; they announced their disbandment in 1999. The group returned to the music scene in 2008. Another all-female band, Morning Musume, produced by Tsunku, former leader of band Sharam Q became very popular, with a string of releases that were sales hits before even being released. The group's popularity gave origin to the Hello! Project. Following the pattern set a decade before by the 1980s all-female Onyanko Club, Morning Musume spawned several splinter bands.

In the late 1990s and early 21st century, female singers such as Hikaru Utada, Ayumi Hamasaki, Misia, Mai Kuraki, and Ringo Sheena became chart-toppers who wrote their own songs or their own lyrics. Hikaru Utada is the daughter of Keiko Fuji, a popular singer of the 1970s. Ayumi Hamasaki was made Utada's contemporary rival, though both women claimed the "competition" was merely a creation of their record companies and the media.

Zeebra introduced hip-hop to Japanese mainstream music. In 1999, Zeebra was featured by Dragon Ash in their song titled "Grateful Days", which topped the Oricon charts.

=== 2000s: Diversification ===
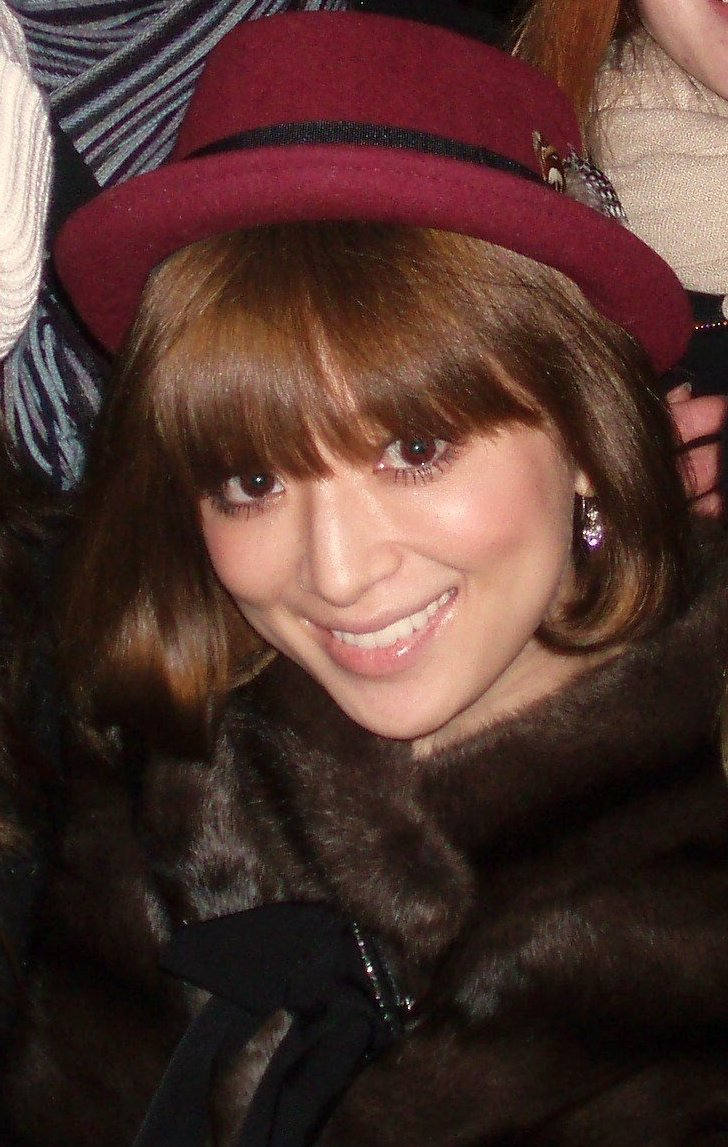
Ayumi Hamasaki in London, February 2010

==== Avex group ====
Ayumi Hamasaki won Grand Prix awards for three consecutive years—the first time in Japan Record Award history—between 2001 and 2003. Although Hamasaki became very famous, Tom Yoda, then-chairman of her record company Avex Group, argued that her tactics were risky, because Avex disregarded the modern portfolio theory. This concern disappeared when the company's other singers (such as Ai Otsuka, Kumi Koda, and Exile) also reached a certain level of popularity in the mid-2000s under Yoda's management policy. BoA, a Korean singer also a part of Avex group, also achieved high levels of success although being Korean in Japan. She opened the Hallyu door to other Korean artists so that they may achieve varying levels of success in Japan as well.

==== Chaku-uta ====
In December 2002, the digital-download market for ringtone songs (着うた, chaku-uta) was created by mobile-phone company au. The market for digital downloads grew rapidly, and Hikaru Utada's 2007 song "Flavor of Life" sold over 7 million downloaded copies. In October 2007, EMI Music Japan announced that Utada was the world's first artist to have 10 million digital sales in one year. According to the International Federation of the Phonographic Industry's 2009 digital music report, Thelma Aoyama's digital single "Soba ni Iru ne" and Greeeen's digital single "Kiseki" sold 8.2 million copies and 6.2 million copies, respectively, in the 2008 download rankings.

==== Japanese hip-hop and urban pop ====
In the first decade of the 21st century, hip-hop and contemporary R&B influences in Japanese music started to gain attention in popular mainstream music. In November 2001, R&B duo Chemistry's debut album The Way We Are sold over 1.14 million copies in the first week, and debuted at the number-one position on the Oricon weekly album charts. Hip-hop bands such as Rip Slyme and Ketsumeishi were also at the top of the Oricon charts. Rock band Orange Range featured several elements of hip-hop in their music. Orange Range's album musiQ sold over 2.6 million copies, making it the number one album of 2005 on the Oricon charts.

Pop/R&B singer Ken Hirai topped the Oricon yearly album chart in 2006 with the release of his greatest hits album 10th Anniversary Complete Single Collection '95-'05 Utabaka, selling over 2 million copies. The pop/hip-hop duo, Halcali, have the honor of being the first Japanese female hip-hop artists to break the Oricon top 10 charts. They have also performed overseas two times in 2008, once at the Anime Central festival in Chicago, and once more at Central Park, NYC on Japan Day. Exile, the dance-vocal group under Avex's sublabel Rhythm Zone, had several million-seller albums. Their album Exile Love topped the Oricon yearly album chart in 2008. Veteran rapper Dohzi-T collaborated with popular singers such as Shota Shimizu, Hiromi Go, Miliyah Kato, and Thelma Aoyama in his successful 2008 album 12 Love Stories. Although there were only 132 new artists in Japan in 2001, according to the Recording Industry Association of Japan, the number increased to 512 in 2008. In 2008, 14 new artists, such as Thelma Aoyama, attended the NHK Kōhaku Uta Gassen for the first time.

==== Popularity of live performances and veteran musicians ====
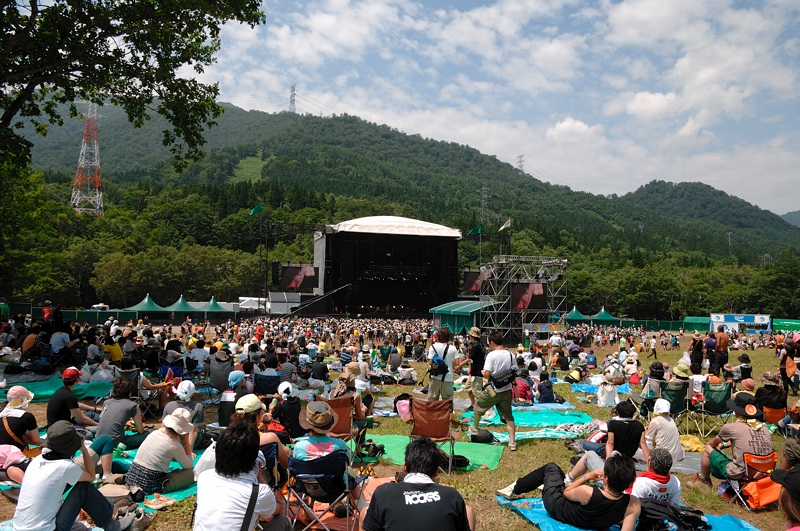
Green Stage of the Fuji Rock Festival

Rock musicians such as Mr. Children, B'z, Southern All Stars, L'Arc-en-Ciel, and Glay still topped the charts in the first decade of the 21st century. Mr. Children's song "Sign" won the Grand Prix award at the 46th Japan Record Awards in 2004. When the group released their album Home in 2007, they passed 50 million albums and singles sold, making them the second-highest selling artist of all time in Japan since the origin of Oricon—just behind B'z, who held the number-one position with more than 75 million records sold until then. Home topped the 2007 Oricon yearly album charts.

The sales of physical CDs declined, but audiences to see live performances increased. Eikichi Yazawa took part in rock festivals, and, in 2007, he became the first artist to have performed 100 concerts at the Nippon Budokan.

Other artists, such as Namie Amuro, also continued their long-running careers with successful releases in this period. Her live tour, Namie Amuro Best Fiction tour 2008-2009, not only became the biggest live tour by a Japanese solo female artist—attended by 450,000 fans in Japan—but was also attended by 50,000 fans in Taiwan and Shanghai. While Kazumasa Oda's 2005 album Sōkana topped the Oricon weekly album charts, his 2007 single "Kokoro" reached the weekly single charts, breaking Yujiro Ishihara's record and making him the then-oldest singer to top the single charts. Mariya Takeuchi's greatest hits album Expressions topped the Oricon album chart in 2008, making her the oldest female singer with the longest active career to reach the number-one position.

==== Johnny & Associates ====
Johnny & Associates's all-male groups remained well-known. In 2001, SMAP released their greatest-hits album SMAP Vest, which sold over a million copies in the first week. In November 2001, Johnny & Associates established the label J Storm for their band Arashi. SMAP's 2003 single "Sekai ni hitotsu dake no hana" sold more than two million copies, being the number-one single in the Oricon yearly single charts for that year. In 2007, Guinness World Records honored KinKi Kids for holding a world record for the number of singles debuting at the number-one position since their debut: 25. SMAP was said to fight a lonely battle at the Kōhaku Uta Gassen, as seen from the viewpoint of its audience share. In 2008, male musicians established a record of four consecutive wins at the Kōhaku Uta Gassen. Arashi's greatest hits album All the Best! 1999–2009 topped the 2009 Oricon yearly album charts.

Johnny & Associates also produced new groups such as Hey! Say! JUMP, Tackey & Tsubasa, NEWS, Kanjani Eight, and KAT-TUN. In 2006, KAT-TUN's debut single "Real Face", written by Shikao Suga and composed by Tak Matsumoto, sold over one million copies and topped the Oricon Yearly Charts. In 2007, temporary Johnny's Jr. group Hey! Say! 7 broke a record as the youngest male group to ever top Oricon charts, with an average age of 14.8 years. Later that year, Hey! Say! JUMP broke a record as the largest group to debut in Johnny's history, with ten members. They also became the youngest group ever to perform in Tokyo Dome with the average age of 15.7 years old. On the 2008 yearly singles charts, only one single ranked in the top 30 was sung by a female (Namie Amuro's single "60s 70s 80s") except gender-mixed groups, partly because the boy bands enjoyed an advantage in physical single sales. In 2009, Johnny's Jr. artist Yuma Nakayama w/B.I.Shadow became the youngest artist to have their first single to debut at the number-one spot, as the band had an average age of 14.6 years, breaking the former record set by female group Minimoni, 14.8 years.

==== Cover versions and classical pop ====
In February 2001, Ulfuls released their cover version of Kyu Sakamoto's 1963 song "Ashita Ga Arusa". Their cover version debuted at the number-five position, behind Utada, Kinki Kids, Hamasaki and Hirai. In March, Yoshimoto Kogyo's special band "Re: Japan" also released their cover version of "Ashita Ga Arusa". When Ulfuls's cover version of this song remained at number eight, Re: Japan's version topped the Oricon weekly single charts.

In 2003, Man Arai released the single "Sen no Kaze ni Natte" ("As A Thousand Winds") based on the Western poem "Do not stand at my grave and weep". In Japan, the poem was known for Rokusuke Ei's reading at the funeral of Kyu Sakamoto in 1985. Japanese tenor singer Masafumi Akikawa covered the song in 2006. Akikawa's cover version of the song became the first classical music single to top the Oricon charts, and sold over one million copies. On the 2007 Oricon Yearly Charts, the single became the best-selling physical single, scoring a victory over Utada's "Flavor of Life". Oricon claimed that the song was not J-pop. On the other hand, sheet music from the Zen-On Music Company Ltd classified the song as J-pop.

Hideaki Tokunaga covered many female songs on his cover album series, Vocalist. He released Vocalist, Vocalist 2, Vocalist 3, Vocalist 4 and Vocalist Vintage (Vocalist 5) in 2005, 2006, 2007, 2010, and 2012 respectively. In August 2007, Vocalist 3 became Oricon weekly number-one cover album with 2 weeks (tied the record in Japan), and in May 2010, Vocalist 4 became the Japan first Oricon monthly number-one cover album.

In 2010, other singers also released cover albums of Japanese songs such as Juju's Request and Kumi Koda's Eternity: Love & Songs. Superfly released a single that came with a cover album of Western rock songs, titled Wildflower & Cover Songs: Complete Best 'Track 3', ultimately becoming the band's third consecutive album to debut at number one on the Oricon weekly album charts.

==== Influence from neofolk and neo Shibuya-kei ====
Folk duos, such as 19, Yuzu and Kobukuro, became popular during the period. Their music was called "neofolk". In October 2007, Kobukuro's double-album All Singles Best became the first male album to ship three million copies in the 21st century in Japan. In January 2008, their album 5296 beat out Ayumi Hamasaki's album Guilty on the Oricon charts, though she previously had eight consecutive number-one studio albums.

Electronic music bands such as Plus-Tech Squeeze Box and Capsule were called "neo Shibuya-kei". Yasutaka Nakata, a member of Capsule, became the song producer for girl group Perfume. In April 2008, for the first time as a technopop band in 25 years since Yellow Magic Orchestra's 1983 album Naughty Boys, Perfume achieved a number-one album Game on the Oricon charts. In July 2008, their single "Love the World" debuted at number one, making it the first technopop song to reach number one in Oricon history. Other Japanese female technopop artists soon followed, including Aira Mitsuki, immi, Mizca, SAWA, Saoriiiii, and Sweet Vacation.

==== Anime music, image song and vocaloid ====
During the late 2000s and the early 2010s, the anime music industry, such as voice actors and image songs, added weight to Japanese music. Though anime music was formerly influenced by J-pop and visual kei music, Japanese indie music apparently influenced the genre at the 2006 FanimeCon. In 2007, after sampling voice actress Saki Fujita's voice to develop it, Vocaloid Hatsune Miku was released, and many songs featuring Hatsune Miku were shown on the Nico Nico Douga. Some of the musicians featuring Hatsune Miku, such as Livetune and Supercell, joined large record companies in Japan. Livetune released Re: Package on Victor Entertainment on August 27, 2008, and Supercell released Supercell on Sony Music on March 4, 2009. The albums Re: Package and Supercell were not brought under the control of the copyright system of the Japanese Society for Rights of Authors, Composers and Publishers (JASRAC), breaking the tradition that the musicians under the major labels affiliated with the system.

In June 2009, voice actress Nana Mizuki's album Ultimate Diamond became the first voice actor album to reach number one on the Oricon weekly charts. The fictional all female band Hōka-go Tea Time, from the anime series K-On!, released the mini-album Hōka-go Tea Time on July 22, 2009. The mini-album debuted at number one on the Oricon weekly album charts, becoming the first album by anime characters to reach number one. The single "Only My Railgun" by fripSide, which served as the opening theme song for the anime series A Certain Scientific Railgun, became a massive hit after its release in November 2009. The song has been certified Gold by the Recording Industry Association of Japan for both physical and streaming department. In May 2010, Exit Tunes Presents Vocalogenesis feat. Hatsune Miku became the first album featuring Vocaloids to reach number one on the Oricon weekly charts, replacing Hideaki Tokunaga's Vocalist 4, which had topped the charts for four consecutive weeks.

=== 2010s: Popularity of idol groups ===
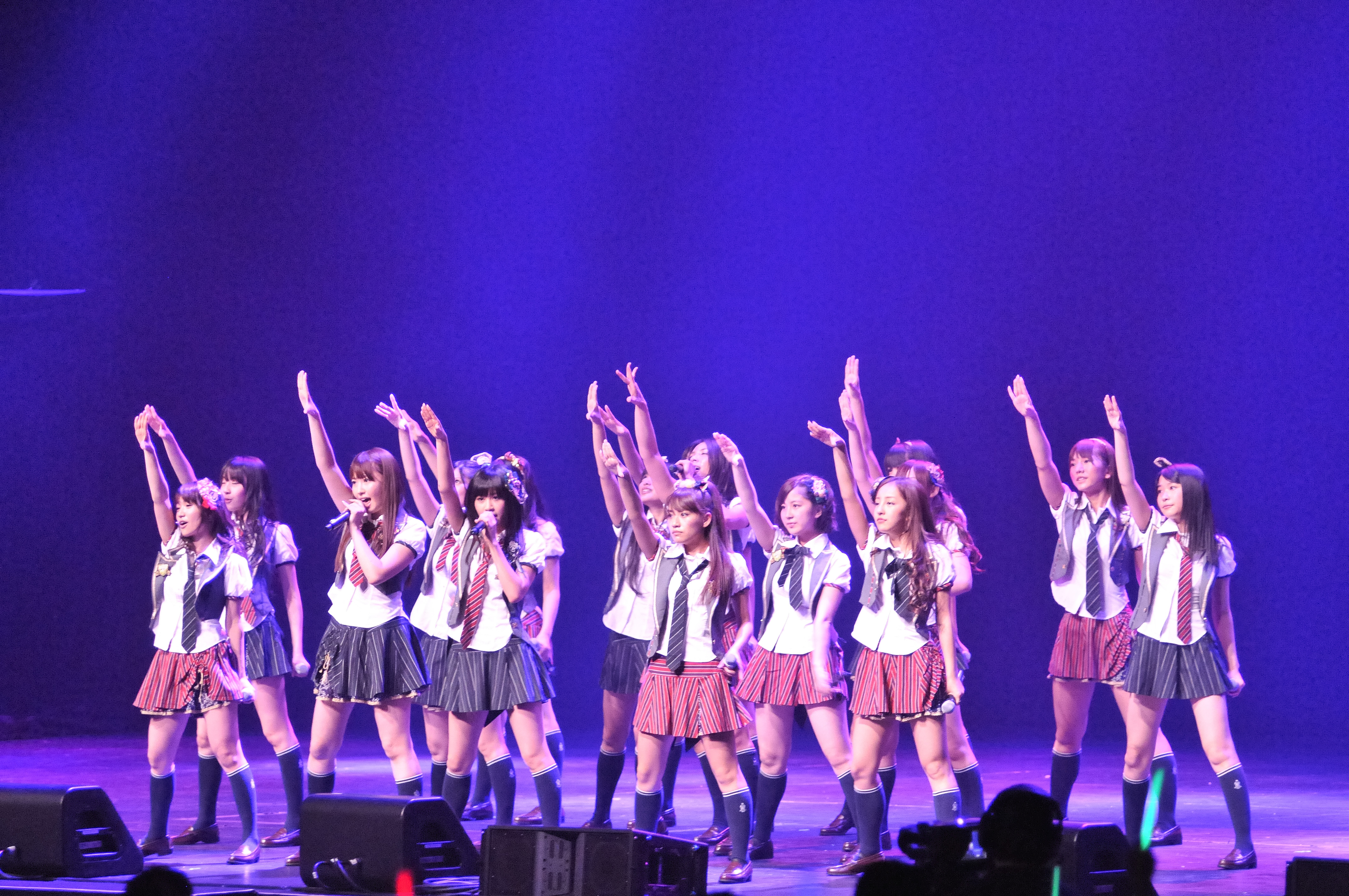
AKB48 has occupied the top spot in the Oricon yearly single sales ranking every year since 2010.

Through the 2010s, more and more idol groups have emerged. This period in the Japanese entertainment industry, nicknamed the "Warring Idols Period" (アイドル戦国時代, aidoru sengoku jidai) because of the increased activity by idol groups, an allusion to the Sengoku-jidai. Some of the most successful groups during the 2010s include Hey! Say! JUMP, AKB48, Arashi, Kanjani Eight, Morning Musume, and Momoiro Clover Z.

Kyary Pamyu Pamyu, a Harajuku-based fashion model, made her musical debut in 2011 and gained international popularity with her debut single "Pon Pon Pon", recognized by some Western celebrities such as Katy Perry and Ariana Grande. She is produced by Yasutaka Nakata, who also produces the group Perfume. She subsequently gained success through her songs "Ninja Re Bang Bang" and "Fashion Monster". During 2014, about 486,000 people attended Momoiro Clover Z's live concerts, which was the highest recorded concert attendance for any female musician in Japan.

In 2019, AKB48 announced the postponement of its general election, and Arashi announced the group's hiatus.

=== 2020s: Global popularity ===
Idol groups remained relevant in the 2020s. According to surveys in Japan for 2024, popular Japanese groups include ME:I, Number i, Naniwa Danshi, Snow Man, Fruits Zipper, and NiziU. Popular solo singers and duets include Yoasobi, Mrs. Green Apple, Creepy Nuts, and Ado.

J-pop has begun to appear in global charts, although it had not had such popularity before. Yoasobi's song "Idol" became the first Japanese song to reach number one on the Billboard Global Excl. U.S. chart, as well as on the Apple Music and YouTube Music charts. By 2024, Showa retro and other Japanese pop music has become particularly popular in South Korea. The main artists that lead the genre internationally during the decade include Yoasobi, Creepy Nuts, Ado, Fujii Kaze, LiSA, and King Gnu.

== Age free music ==
A joint campaign between the Recording Industry Association of Japan and 15 record companies, supported by music critic Issei Tomizawa, under the name of "age free music" (Japanese: エイジ・フリー・ミュージック), based on the philosophy of introducing great songs and artists regardless of age, genre, or career history, was made to capture mature listeners, and eventually reach the younger generation. Its main characteristic is that the music in it is neither enka, kayōkyoku nor standard J-pop, a comparative concept to western Adult contemporary music, which merges different genres and artists that appeal to older generations.

The project has been adopted by radio stations and karaoke businesses. Tomizawa leads a radio program called Age Free Music!, which started in 2009.

Artists have united to take the project to the concert stages, once in 2010, a second time in 2011.

A book by Tomizawa regarding the project, called "Age Free Music otona no ongaku", was published in 2011.

A documentary related to Tomizawa and the project aired on BS TV Tokyo in 2016.

== Artists ==
Some Japanese pop artists are extremely popular in Japan, and some also have fanbases in other countries—especially in Asia, but also in Western countries. They influence not only music, but also fashion. As of 2016, the top five best-selling artists in the Japanese Oricon charts history are B'z, Mr. Children, Ayumi Hamasaki, Southern All Stars, and Dreams Come True. Among the five, Hamasaki holds the record for being the only solo artist.

== See also ==
- Cool Japan
- Culture of Japan
- Japanese hardcore
- Japanese ska
- City pop
- Shibuya-kei
- Music industry of East Asia
- Voice acting in Japan
- Soft power § Japan

== Bibliography ==
- Buckley, Sandra (2002). Encyclopedia of Contemporary Japanese Culture. Taylor & Francis. ISBN 978-0-415-14344-8.
- Atkins, E. Taylor (2001). Blue Nippon: Authenticating Jazz in Japan. Duke University Press. ISBN 978-0-8223-2721-9.
- Minichiello, Sharon (1998). Japan's Competing Modernities: Issues in Culture and Democracy, 1900-1930. University of Hawaii Press. ISBN 978-0-8248-2080-0.
- Yano, Christine Reiko (2003). Tears of Longing: Nostalgia and the Nation in Japanese Popular Song. Harvard University Asia Center. ISBN 978-0-674-01276-9.
