= Sowelu discography =

- Studio albums: 5
- Extended plays: 1
- Soundtrack albums: 2
- Compilation albums: 2
- Singles: 19
- Video albums: 2

The discography of Sowelu, a Japanese pop and R&B singer, consists of five studio albums, one extended play, two compilation albums, 18 singles, and multiple appearances on cover compilation albums, as well as a featured artist on other musicians' works. Sowelu's solo discography is spread across two record labels: DefStar Records between 2002 and 2009, and Rhythm Zone from 2010 onwards.

== Albums ==
=== Original albums ===
Year	Album Information	Oricon albums charts	Reported sales	Certifications
2003	Geofu: Released: June 25, 2003; Label: DefStar Records (DFCL-1103); Formats: Compact disc, digital download, rental CD	4	205,000	RIAJ: Platinum
2005	Sweet Bridge: Released: January 7, 2005; Label: DefStar (DFCL-1177); Formats: Compact disc, digital download, rental CD	5	134,000	RIAJ: Gold
2006	24 (Twenty Four): Released: July 12, 2006; Label: DefStar (DFCL-1177); Formats: Compact disc, digital download, rental CD	3	84,000	RIAJ: Gold
2008	Naked: Released: April 9, 2008; Label: DefStar (DFCL-1460); Formats: Compact disc, digital download, rental CD	11	27,000	
2010	Love & I (Ren'ai Henreki) (恋愛遍歴; "Love Pilgrimage"): Released: December 1, 2010; Label: Rhythm Zone (RZCD-46653); Formats: Compact disc, digital download, rental CD	19	16,000	

=== Extended plays ===
Year	Album Information	Oricon albums charts	Reported sales
2011	Let Me...: Released: August 24, 2011; Label: Rhythm Zone (RZCD-46879); Formats: Compact disc, digital download, rental CD	TBA	TBA

=== Other albums ===
Year	Album Information	Oricon albums charts	Reported sales
2005	Heads or Tails?: Collaborations compilation album; Released: July 20, 2005; Label: DefStar (DFCL-1215); Formats: Compact disc, digital download, rental CD	10	57,000
2009	Sowelu the Best 2002–2009: DefStar era greatest hits album; Released: March 18, 2009; Label: DefStar (DFCL-1557); Formats: Compact disc, digital download, rental CD	18	17,000

== Singles ==
Release	Title	Notes	Chart positions			Oricon sales	Album
Release	Title	Notes	Oricon singles charts	Billboard Japan Hot 100†	RIAJ digital tracks†	Oricon sales	Album
2002	"Beautiful Dreamer"		20	—	—	15,000	Geofu
2002	"Part of Me"		97	—	—	1,900	Geofu
2003	"Rainbow/Breath (Omoi no Yōryō)" (想いの容量; "Capacity of My Thoughts")		28	—	—	31,000	Geofu
2003	"Fortune"		40	—	—	9,400	Geofu
2003	"Glisten"		15	—	—	19,000	Sweet Bridge
2004	"No Limit"		44	—	—	8,400	Sweet Bridge
2004	"I Will"		12	—	—	32,000	Sweet Bridge
2004	"Last Forever"		34	—	—	9,600	Sweet Bridge
2005	"Do You Remember That?"	Re-cut single	116	—	—	1,100	Sweet Bridge
2005	"Let's Go Faraway"		64	—	—	9,400	24 (Twenty Four)
2005	"Get Over"		19	—	—	10,000	24 (Twenty Four)
2006	"To You"		20	—	—	13,000	24 (Twenty Four)
2006	"Dear Friend"		19	—	—	23,000	24 (Twenty Four)
2007	"Shiawase no Chikara" (幸せのちから; "The Power of Happiness")		20	—	51*	9,700	Naked
2007	"Dare Yori Suki nanoni" (誰より好きなのに; "But I Like You More Than Anyone")		22	—	—	7,400	Naked
2007	"24 Karats (Type S)" with Exile, Doberman Inc	Released simultaneously with exile version, "24 Karats (Version Ex)"	12	—	60*	20,000	Naked
2007	"Hikari" (光; "Light")		28	—	—	6,900	Naked
2008	"Wish"		36	92	—	5,400	Naked
2009	"Material World"		106	92	—	900	The Best
* charted on monthly Chaku-uta Reco-kyō Chart. †Japan Hot 100 established February 2008, RIAJ Digital Track Chart established April 2009.

=== Promotional singles ===
Release	Title	Notes	Chart positions		Album
Release	Title	Notes	Billboard Japan Hot 100	RIAJ digital tracks	Album
2002	"Across My Heart"	Pre-debut song, music video filmed	—	—	Smooth (compilation album)
2006	"Mamoru Beki Mono" (守るべきもの; "Things We Should Protect")	Music video filmed	—	—	24 (Twenty Four)
2010	"Never" feat. Verbal (M-Flo)	Three songs featured as medley for Love & I. music video project	—	—	Love & I (Ren'ai Henreki)
2010	"Koboresō na Kuchibiru" (こぼれそうな唇; "Overflowing Kisses") feat. Mummy-D (Rhymester)	Three songs featured as medley for Love & I. music video project	—	—	Love & I (Ren'ai Henreki)
2010	"Koko mo Soko mo..." (ここもそこも...; "Here and There") duet with KG	Three songs featured as medley for Love & I. music video project	—	—	Love & I (Ren'ai Henreki)
2011	"I Want U To..." feat. Wise		—	—	Let Me...
2011	"Let Me Lead U"		—	—	Let Me...

=== As featured artist ===
Release	Artist	Title	Notes	Chart positions			Oricon sales	Album
Release	Artist	Title	Notes	Oricon Singles Charts	Billboard Japan Hot 100*	RIAJ digital tracks*	Oricon sales	Album
2002	Voices of Korea/Japan	"Let's Get Together Now"	2002 FIFA World Cup theme song	3	—	—	166,000	2002 FIFA World Cup Official Album: Songs of Korea/Japan
2004	Miss Monday feat. Sowelu	"Akatsuki ni Omou" (暁ニ想フ; "Thinking of the Dawn")		124	—	—	1,800	Miss Rainbow
2005	Jhett a.k.a. Yakko for Aquarius feat. Sowelu & Big-O	"Get Ready (Nite 2 Remember)"		84	—	—	4,500	Jhett
2006	Ukatrats FC	"Win and Shine"		48	—	—	6,000	We Love We [We Love Winning Eleven]
2007	Exile, Sowelu, Doberman Inc	"24 Karats (Version Ex)"	Double A-side with "Toki no Kakera"	2	—	91*	142,000	Exile Love
2009	G feat. Sowelu	"I Am Ghost (Kodoku na Jinsei)" (孤独な人生; "Lonely Life")	So Ji-sub Japanese self-cover	51	—	—	2,500	—
2010	Quadraphonic feat. Sowelu	"Kimi o Omou yo..." (君を想うよ...; "I'm Thinking of You...")	Promotional single, music video filmed	—	—	56	—	Quadraphonic

=== Other appearances ===
Release	Artist	Title	Notes	Album
2004	Sowelu	"Candy Rain"	Toshinobu Kubota cover	Soul Tree: A Musical Tribute to Toshinobu Kubota
2004	Sowelu	"Pearl-Color ni Yurete" (パールカラーにゆれて; "Swaying in Pearl-color")	Momoe Yamaguchi cover	Yamaguchi Momoe Tribute: Thank You For...
2005	Maho Minami	"Sly"	Under the name Maho Minami 南真帆	Animation Best Soundtrack: Beck
2005	Saitō-san Band feat. Yukio "Koyuki" Tanaka & Maho Minami	"Follow Me"	Under the name Maho Minami 南真帆	Animation Best Soundtrack: Beck
2005	Yukio "Koyuki" Tanaka & Maho Minami	"Moon on the Water"	Under the name Maho Minami 南真帆	Animation Best Soundtrack: Beck
2005	Sowelu feat. Urb	"Play That Funky Music"	Wild Cherry cover	We Love Dance Classics Vol. 1
2005	Sowelu, Hi-D and Jun 4 Shot from Fire Ball	"Uh"	Music video filmed	Female: Original Soundtrack
2005	Sowelu and Jake Shimabukuro	"Love Is Stronger than Pride"		Female: Original Soundtrack
2005	Sowelu and Leo	"Slow Jam"		Female: Original Soundtrack
2005	M-Flo loves Sowelu	"So Exclusive"		Beat Space Nine
2006	Sowelu	"Piano Man"	Billy Joel cover	Wanna Be the Piano Man
2007	Doberman Inc, Sowelu, Exile	"24 Karats (Type D.I)"		The Best: Time 4 Some Action
2008	Soffet with Sowelu	"The Moment I Saw You"		Jam the Universe
2008	Sowelu	"Time After Time"	Cyndi Lauper cover	We Love Cyndi: Tribute to Cyndi Lauper
2010	S'capade feat. Sowelu	"Hot Body"	Music video filmed	S'capade
2010	KG duet with Sowelu	"Where Is the Love"		Songs of Love
2010	Aili thanx to Sowelu	"Brand New Day"		Future

== DVDs ==
Year	Video information
2005	Sowelu Video Clips Vol. 1: Music video collection; Label: DefStar (DFBL-7069); Released: January 7, 2005
2007	Sowelu Live Tour: Be Happy 2006: Live concert DVD; Label: DefStar (DFBL-7101); Released: June 20, 2007
