= Ayano Tsuji =

- Also known as: うららかさん
- Born: 辻 亜弥乃 Ayano Tsuji; January 6, 1978 (age 48)
- Origin: Sakyō-ku, Kyoto, Japan
- Genres: J-pop, vocal jazz
- Occupations: Singer, songwriter
- Instruments: Singing, ukulele
- Years active: 1998–present (solo)
- Labels: Victor Entertainment, Speedstar
- Website: http://www.tsujiayano.com/

Ayano Tsuji (つじ あやの（辻 亜弥乃）, Tsuji Ayano; born January 6, 1978, in Sakyō-ku, Kyoto, Japan) is a J-pop singer famous in Japan for her unconventional light singing style and ukulele music. She rose to fame after performing the end-title track for the Studio Ghibli film The Cat Returns in 2002. Her other music for TV and anime includes "Tanpopo" for Tensai Terebi Kun.

== Biography ==
In 1993, Tsuji attended Kyoto City Dohda Senior High School of Arts where, during an activities class, she started to learn the ukulele after finding her hands were too small to correctly hold and play the guitar.

In 1996, Tsuji attended Ryukoku University as a student under the literature department. She graduated as a historian from Ryukoku University's Department of Oriental History.

In 1998, she released a mini-album entitled Urara from LD & K Records, making this her independent debut as a musician.

== Discography ==
=== Albums ===
Release date:	Title:
October 10, 1998	Uraraka (うららか) "Balmy"
September 22, 1999	Kimihe no Kimochi (君への気持ち) "I Feel For You"
March 15, 2000	Haru wa Tōki Yume no Hate ni (春は遠き夢の果てに) "Visit Spring in a Far-Away Faint Dream"
April 18, 2001	Harumikan (春蜜柑) "Flowers of Tangerine"
April 17, 2002	Balanço
December 11, 2002	Koi Suru Megane (恋する眼鏡) "Glasses in Love"
May 21, 2003	Renren Huka (恋恋風歌) "Love Love Wind Song"
May 19, 2004	Cover Girl
November 23, 2005	Calendar Calendar
July 5, 2006	Tsuji Best
September 22, 2006	Hajimari no Toki (はじまりの時) "A New Beginning"
December 19, 2007	Sweet, Sweet Happy Birthday
September 24, 2008	Cover Girl 2
September 16, 2009	Tsuji Gifuto 〜10th Anniversary BEST〜 (つじギフト 〜10th Anniversary BEST〜) "Tsuji's Gift"
September 8, 2010	Niji Shoku no Hana Sakihokoru Toki (虹色の花咲きほこるとき) "When the Rainbow Coloured Flowers Bloom"
January 6, 2022	HELLO WOMAN

=== Singles ===
Release date:	Title:	Notes:
January 26, 2000	Clover (クローバー) "Clover"	
October 18, 2000	Kokoro wa kimi no moto he (心は君のもとへ) "My Heart Longs To Be Near You"	
March 1, 2001	Kimini arigatou (君にありがとう) "Let Me Say 'Thank You'"	
November 21, 2001	Koibito doushi (恋人どうし) "Lovers"	
February 27, 2002	Ai no kakera ☆ Koi no kakera (愛のかけら☆恋のかけら) "Fragments of Love ☆ Love Fragments"	
June 27, 2002	Kazeni naru (風になる) "To Be the Wind"	End-title track for the Studio Ghibli film The Cat Returns
January 22, 2003	Amaoto (雨音) "The Sound Of Rain"	
March 19, 2003	Sakura no Ki no shita de (桜の木の下で) "Under The Cherry Tree"	
May 21, 2003	Arikitarina romansu (ありきたりなロマンス) "Hackneyed Romance"	
December 17, 2003	Parade (パレード) "Parade"	
April 6, 2005	Harukaze (春風) "Spring Wind"	
June 22, 2005	Shiny Day / Ai no manatsu (愛の真夏) "Midsummer Love"	
October 5, 2005	Yubikiri (ゆびきり) / Hoshi furu yoru no Christmas (星降る夜のクリスマス) "Starry Christmas Night"	
December 6, 2006	Sayonara aishiteru (さよなら愛してる) "I Love You... Goodbye"	
February 20, 2008	Arienai Kurai Kiseki (ありえないくらい奇跡) "Much Impossible Miracle"	In collaboration with Beat Crusaders

=== DVDs ===
Release date:	Title:
April 6, 2005	Kyoto Girl
November 23, 2005	Ayano Clip / Ayano Tsuji no eizou sakuhin shuu (つじあやの映像作品集) "Ayano Tsuji's Collected Visual Works"
