= Marc Zermati =

French record producer (1945–2020)

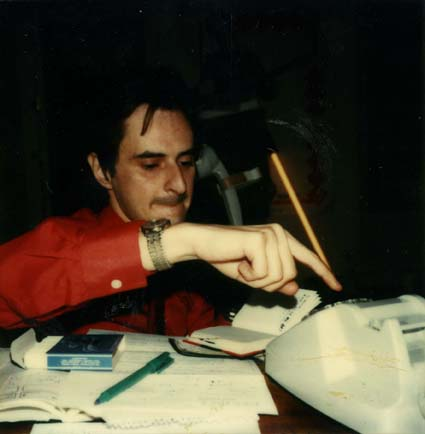
Marc Zermati, 1985

Marc Zermati (21 June 1945 – 13 June 2020) was a French producer and promoter of punk rock music, and businessman.

== Life and career ==
Zermati, a Sephardic Jew, was born in Algiers and arrived in France in the 1960s. A fan of jazz and blues, he owned the Open Market record shop in Les Halles, Paris, selling mostly US garage and punk rock music from London, Amsterdam and New York City. The shop closed in 1977.

In 1972 he co-founded the Skydog record label, which issued its first release, the Flamin' Groovies' Grease 7" EP in May 1973, pre-dating Stiff Records by over 3 years, and formed the first independent shop distribution in France. In August 1976, and again in 1977, Zermati organised the "first European punk rock festival" in the French town of Mont-de-Marsan. He organised tours in France by bands including The Clash, Dr. Feelgood, The Heartbreakers, and Eddie and the Hot Rods, as well as concerts by the Ramones and Talking Heads.

In 1976 he set up Bizarre Distribution with Larry Debay, an independent record distribution company in London that giving an outlet for new independent labels. His Skydog label issued records by The Damned, Motörhead, MC5, Iggy and the Stooges and dozens of others. He also managed bands including the Lou's and Stinky Toys, and organised international tours by Les Dogs and Flamin' Groovies.

In the 1990s he set up a record label called "Kind of Groove" as a Skydog subsidiary label, presenting experimental, electronic and acid jazz music. Bands like the Japanese/French U.F.O., the German Marc Ashmann or the French/American CFM Band did several records on this label.

Zermati died on 13 June 2020 from a heart attack.

== Festival and tour organiser ==
- The Heartbreakers ('76)
- Eddie and the Hot Rods
- Chrissie Hynde
- The Clash
- Wilko Johnson
- Dogs
- Big Audio Dynamite
- The Damned
- Happy Mondays
- Anne Pigalle
- Mano Negra
- Daft Punk
- Air
- Atom Rhumba

== Productions ==
- Motörhead
- New York Dolls
- Johnny Thunders
- Wayne Kramer
- MC5
- Flambeurs
- Bebe Buell.
- Iggy Pop
- Flamin' Groovies
- Kim Fowley
- 54 Nude Honeys
- Marc Ashmann
- Pimpi Aroyo/ City Zen
- United Future Organization
- CFM Band
- Bossa Nova Beatniks
