= 54 Nude Honeys =

Japanese punk rock band

- Origin: Tokyo, Japan
- Genres: Punk rock, pop punk, post-punk, beat
- Years active: 1992–2007
- Labels: Epic Sony, Skydog International, Mademoiselle, UK Project, Lion, Vinyl Japan
- Members: Vivi; Kotome; Yuri

54 Nude Honeys (Japanese: フィフティフォー・ヌード・ハニーズ) was a Japanese punk rock band formed in 1992, in Tokyo. The band was primarily composed of the bass guitarist and co-founder Vivi, the guitarist and co-founder Kotome and the vocalist Yuri. The band and its membership went through a number of reconfigurations between 1992 and 2007, the year in which the band was disbanded. The group has been jokingly likened to the satirical heavy metal group Spinal Tap, due to the number of different drummers that have been involved in the band over separate line-ups. For a portion of the groups active years a second guitarist, Fumi, was added to the line-up. Since 2001 Fumi is a member of the Japanese synth-pop band Polysics. The band has also been noted for its large cult following status in underground music circles and provocative stage outfits, choosing to dress in all leather.

== History ==
54 Nude Honeys were formed in 1992 by the Japanese bass guitarist Vivi and the guitarist Kotome. They rehearsed and wrote punk-oriented rock songs before completing the line-up with the vocalist Yuri. The name 54 Nude Honeys came from a deck of playing cards popular with American forces in World War II, which had images of nude women on the fronts. For its first three years, the band played shows around Japan before attracting interest from the Japanese independent record label Lion Records, who released the band's first single Happy Honey Pretty Go on September 10, 1995.

After the first single gained success on the independent music scene in Japan, the Epic Sony subsidiary label dohb Discs released the band's first mini-album, Crazy Honey Bunny, on October 1, 1995. In 1996, the mini-album Q-Tee Spy was released as well as the single "Ai No Vulgar/Pretty Vacant", the B-side of which was a Sex Pistols' track from their 1977 first album, Never Mind the Bollocks, Here's the Sex Pistols. The single was released as a promotional tool in the lead up to their first full-length album, Go Go Cabaret. One more mini-album, Animal Girl, was released in 1997 with Lion Records before the band's second full-length album Drop the Gun the following year. Drop the Gun had some underground success for the band in Europe and especially the UK once in the hand of Raison D"Etre London collective and Mademoiselle records A&R's Yvan Serrano Fontova aka DJ Healer Selecta (Dustaphonics), where they were signed to Mademoiselle records after being dropped from their Epic Sony/dohb Discs deal. For the Drop the Gun album, the band recruited a second guitarist, Fumi. Three promotional singles wrer released from the album, "One-Eyed Bat", "Man to Sun" and the double A-side "Hot Generation"/"I’m A Rubber Man". "Man to Sun" did not appear on Drop the Gun and was later released on Snake & Queen.

After the tour for the Drop the Gun album, Snake & Queen, the group's third full-length album, was released in 2000. Shortly after the release of the album, Fumi left the band to join the Japanese synth-pop band Polysics as a full member in 2001. In January 2001, 54 Nude Honeys teamed up with the British punk band the Diaboliks for the split EP 54 Nude Honeys Vs Diaboliks – Black Tight Killers which had two 54 Nude Honeys' songs, "Man to Sun" and "Hell on Debt".

In 2003, the band moved to New York to record a fourth and final full-length album 54 Nude Honeys. The album was the band's most successful album both in sales and reviews and was produced by the famed punk producer Marc Zermati. The single, "Where is Love?", was released to promote the album, the group's last original release.

In 2006, the group toured France and played a show in Switzerland. While touring in Europe, a greatest hits compilation also titled 54 Nude Honeys was released by the band's new French label, Skydog International. A special edition version of this compilation was released with a bonus DVD of the group's three promotional music videos (for "Jungle Girl", "Drop the Gun" and "Where is Love") and a live performance from 2003 at the punk rock venue CBGB in New York.

In 2007, it was announced that the band would break up.

== Members ==
Current members

- Vivi - bass guitar and vocals (1992–2007)
- Kotome - guitar and vocals (1992–2007)
- Yuri - vocals (1992–2007)

Past members

- Fumi - guitar (1994–1999)
- Ryo - drums
- Pomp - drums
- Jun - drums
- Zina - vocals (Drop The Gun single)

== Discography ==
Albums

- Go Go Cabaret (1995)
- Drop the Gun (1998)
- Snake & Queen (2000)
- 54 Nude Honeys (2003)

Mini-albums

- Crazy Honey Bunny (1995)
- Q-Tee Spy (1996)
- Animal Girl (1997)

Compilations

- 54 Nude Honeys (Greatest Hits) (2006)

Singles/EP's

- Happy Honey Pretty Go! (1995)
- Ai No Vulgar/Pretty Vacant (1996)
- One-Eyed Bat (1999)
- Hot Generation/I’m A Rubber Man (2000)
- Man to Sun (2000)
- Black Tight Killers (54 Nude Honeys/Diaboliks) (2001)
- Where is Love? (2003)

Appearances

- Attack of the Terrible Boots (1997)
- Shot the Pink Gun - Bad Tracks for Bambi (1999)
- Hanoi Rocks - Bloody knuckles & Lipstick (2000)
- Greatful Sound: Tribute to Beck (2002)
- Rock N Roll Summit (2004)
- Rock One Special Japon (2006)
- Monster CD No. 15 (2006)

Covers

- The Thing - Bag It! ("Drop the Gun" cover) (2009)
