= 54 Nude Honeys (Greatest Hits) =

Compilation album by 54 Nude Honeys
- Released: April 17, 2006
- Recorded: 1996–2003
- Genre: Punk rock
- Label: Skydog International

54 Nude Honeys (Greatest Hits) is the first and only compilation album by the Japanese punk rock band 54 Nude Honeys, released on April 17, 2006, by Skydog International, a French punk label. It is also the group's final release. A limited pressing of the album was released with a bonus DVD of the group's three music videos and a live performance recorded at the CBGB punk club in New York.

== Track listing ==
No.	Title	Length
1.	"Drop the Gun"	2:08
2.	"Lid on my Head"	2:30
3.	"Wild Girl"	3:38
4.	"Bikini"	2:25
5.	"Drift Guitar"	1:56
6.	"Hot Generation"	2:18
7.	"Surf Cat"	1:57
8.	"Get on the Bus"	6:07
9.	"Drop the Gun (Instrumental)"	1:38
10.	"Where is Love?"	2:36
11.	"Full of Potholes"	2:18
12.	"No Way"	1:27
13.	"Hard Drunker"	1:45
14.	"Fat Liver"	2:08
15.	"Go to Hell"	2:45
16.	"Ghost Town"	2:06
17.	"Don’t Shut Me Up"	2:25
18.	"Lost in Forest (Instrumental)"	3:30
19.	"Boring Man"	3:07

Bonus DVD
No.	Title	Length
1.	"Jungle Girl [Video]"	2:15
2.	"Drop the Gun [Video]"	3:45
3.	"Where is Love? [Video]"	2:21
4.	"Live CBGB (NY 2003)"	30:00
5.	"Live At Delancey Death Disco"	20:00
