= Snake & Queen =

Studio album by 54 Nude Honeys
- Released: July 27, 2000
- Recorded: Early 2000
- Genres: Post-punk, punk rock
- Label: UK Project

54 Nude Honeys chronology
Drop the Gun (1998)	Snake & Queen (2000)	54 Nude Honeys (2003)

Snake & Queen is the third album from Japanese punk rock band 54 Nude Honeys, released on July 27, 2000.

== Track listing ==
No.	Title	Length
1.	"High Tide"
2.	"Man to Sun"
3.	"Jump"
4.	"Try Your Rocket"
5.	"Love Song"
6.	"Hidden Charm"
7.	"High on Cloud"
8.	"Run san Run"
9.	"Hard Guy Attack Man"
10.	"Jungle"
11.	"405"
12.	"Hell On"
13.	"Snake & Queen"
