= Drop the Gun =

Studio album by 54 Nude Honeys
- Released: November 10, 1998
- Recorded: Mid-1998
- Genre: Post-punk, punk rock
- Label: UK Project

54 Nude Honeys chronology
Go Go Cabaret (1998)	Drop the Gun (1998)	Snake & Queen (2000)

Drop the Gun is the second album from Japanese punk rock band 54 Nude Honeys, released on November 10, 1998.

== Track listing ==
No.	Title	Length
1.	"Drop the Gun"
2.	"Dragon"
3.	"Dirty Old Man"
4.	"Lid on my Head"
5.	"Wild Girl"
6.	"Sheep"
7.	"Bikini"
8.	"Drift Guitar"
9.	"Hot Generation"
10.	"I’m a Rubber Man"
11.	"One-Eyed Bat"
12.	"Surf Cat"
13.	"Get on the Bus"
14.	"Drop the Gun (Part II)"
