= Go Go Cabaret =

Go Go Cabaret (Around the World)

Studio album by 54 Nude Honeys
- Released: December 1, 1996
- Recorded: Mid-1995
- Genre: Post-punk, pop punk
- Label: Epic Sony/dohb Discs

54 Nude Honeys chronology
Go Go Cabaret (Around the World) (1996)	Drop the Gun (1998)

Go Go Cabaret (Around the World) is the full-length debut album from Japanese punk rock band 54 Nude Honeys, released on December 1, 1996.

== Track listing ==
No.	Title	Length
1.	"Honeys! Cabaret! Go-Go Party!"
2.	"Get on the Road"
3.	"Go-Go Honey"
4.	"Have Love Will Travel"
5.	"Poo"
6.	"Boo Doo"
7.	"Bad Man"
8.	"Drive a Go-Go"
9.	"Girls in the Waste"
10.	"Honeys in the Bathroom"
11.	"Ai No Buugaruu"
12.	"White Garlic"
13.	"Go-Go Beach in the World"
14.	"Roackaway Beach"
15.	"Bike Guitar"
16.	"Mini Mini Money More"
17.	"Bad Luck"
18.	"Bonus Track"
19.	"Kung Fu Mama"
20.	"Do You Wanna Dance?"
21.	"Thank You"
22.	"Honeys! Cabaret! Go-Go Party! (Part 2)"
23.	"Bye Bye"
