= 54 Nude Honeys (album) =

Studio album by 54 Nude Honeys
- Released: July 9, 2003
- Recorded: Early 2003, New York
- Genres: Post-punk, punk rock
- Label: UK Project

54 Nude Honeys chronology
Snake & Queen (2000)	54 Nude Honeys (2003)

54 Nude Honeys is the eponymous fourth full-length album from Japanese punk rock band 54 Nude Honeys, released on July 9, 2003. It is also the group's final full-length studio album.

== Track listing ==
No.	Title	Length
1.	"Where is Love?"
2.	"Full of Potholes"
3.	"No Way"
4.	"Hard Drunker"
5.	"Fat Liver"
6.	"Go to Hell"
7.	"Ghost Town"
8.	"Don’t Shut Me Up"
9.	"Lost in Forest"
10.	"Boring Man"
