= P.O.A: Pop on Arrival =

P.O.A.: Pop on Arrival

Studio album by Beat Crusaders
- Released: May 11, 2005
- Genre: Rock
- Length: 38:55
- Label: DefSTAR Records

P.O.A.: Pop on Arrival is the fifth studio album released by Japanese band Beat Crusaders, and the first full-length album released under the DefSTAR Records label. It was released on May 11, 2005.

Upon its release, there were two versions available, the Original Version and Limited Edition (初回生産限定盤: The first production limited board). The Original Version features 14 tracks, while the Limited Edition includes bonus tracks "Get Up! Get Up!" and "Say Good-Night", which differentiate the order of tracks on either CD.

== Tracks ==
Limited Edition CD

1. "Nampla" – 0:32
2. "Isolations" – 2:15
3. "Hit in the USA" – 2:59
4. "Feel" – 2:47
5. "Lovepotion #9" – 2:48
6. "Get Up! Get Up! (bonus track)" – 2:46
7. "Clown for the Day" – 3:12
8. "Sasquatch" – 1:37
9. "Japanese Girl" – 2:32
10. "Love Is Inspiration" – 1:56
11. "Disaster" – 3:01
12. "Love Dischord" – 4:02
13. "Block Bastard" – 3:42
14. "Rusk" – 2:58
15. "Say Good-Night (bonus track)" – 3:24
16. "S×E×X×I×S×T" – 1:44
