= Hit in the USA =

Single by Beat Crusaders

from the album P.O.A.: Pop on Arrival
- Released: October 20, 2004
- Recorded: 2004
- Genre: Pop punk
- Length: 9:43
- Label: Defstar Records

"Hit in the USA" is a single released by Japanese band Beat Crusaders, and the song was used as the opening for the anime series Beck: Mongolian Chop Squad, and was later added to the P.O.A.: Pop on Arrival full-length album in 2005. "Hit in the USA" was released October 20, 2004. They also released a maxi single, containing three songs featured on the anime series.

== Tracks ==
Single

1. "Hit in the USA" – 2:59
2. "Supercollider" – 3:01
3. "B.A.D." – 3:43
