= All You Can Eat (Beat Crusaders album) =

Studio album by Beat Crusaders
- Released: February 26, 2002
- Genre: Rock

All You Can Eat is the second studio album by the Japanese band, Beat Crusaders. It was also their second album to be released in the United States.

== Track listing ==
1. "GTS" – 2:07
2. "Joker in the Crotch" – 1:47
3. "Windom" – 2:33
4. "Firestarter" – 2:58
5. "Sad Symphony" – 2:10
6. "Delerious" – 2:06
7. "Blister Blues" – 2:23
8. "Ponderosa" (At The Speed Of Sound) – 0:58
