= All You Can Eat (Thunder album) =

Live album by Thunder
- Released: 29 January 2016
- Recorded: October – November 2014
- Venue: RAK Studios (London, England); Brooklyn Bowl, The O2 (London, England); Rockfield Studios (Monmouth, Wales); Saitama Super Arena (Tokyo, Japan)
- Genre: Hard rock; heavy metal
- Length: 5:05:14
- Label: earMusic
- Producer: Luke Morley; Kenny Dogleash

Thunder live album chronology
Back to the Black Country (2014)	All You Can Eat (2016)

Thunder video chronology
At the End of the Road: Live in London 11th July 2009 (2009)	All You Can Eat (2016)

All You Can Eat is the thirty-second live album and eleventh video by English hard rock band Thunder. It is a three-part collection documenting a number of live performances in 2014, as well as the recording and production of the band's 2015 tenth studio album Wonder Days. The album was released on 29 January 2016 by earMusic. The video portion of the release topped the UK Music Video Chart, while the full album charted at number 101 on the Japanese Albums Chart.

Presented in three parts, All You Can Eat consists of Live at RAK Studio 1, recorded at London's RAK Studios on 4 November 2014, Live at the Brooklyn Bowl, recorded at The O2's Brooklyn Bowl two days later, and Wonder Days: The Film, a behind the scenes documentary filmed during the recording of Wonder Days, as well as footage from the band's appearance at Loud Park Festival on 19 October 2014 and highlights from the RAK Studios and Brooklyn Bowl performances.

In addition to its release as a three-disc set, All You Can Eat was released in Japan and online with a bonus disc featuring the band's full performance at the Saitama Super Arena in Tokyo for Loud Park Festival. Live at RAK Studio 1, Live at Brooklyn Bowl and Live at Loud Park were also issued separately as limited edition albums on 12" vinyl. Thunder's second guitarist Ben Matthews was not present for any of the live recordings, and was replaced by Peter Shoulder.

== Background ==
Thunder performed only three shows in 2014 – on 28 June at Calling Festival in London, on 19 October at Loud Park Festival in Tokyo, Japan, and on 6 November at The O2's Brooklyn Bowl in London – and spent the rest of the year recording their tenth studio album Wonder Days. At the beginning of the year, the band's second guitarist and keyboardist Ben Matthews was diagnosed with head and neck cancer, which excluded him from taking part in any of the shows and much of the album's recording. He was replaced by Peter Shoulder – lead guitarist Luke Morley's bandmate in The Union – and was later "given the all-clear" in November.

The band's performances at Loud Park Festival and the Brooklyn Bowl in 2014 were recorded, in addition to a rehearsal session on 4 November at RAK Studios in London, for release on All You Can Eat. The RAK Studio session was included as the "starter" of the set, the Brooklyn Bowl performance as the "main course", and the Loud Park set as part of the "dessert" disc, which also featured a documentary about the recording of Wonder Days and footage from RAK Studios and the Brooklyn Bowl. Some editions of the album contained the Loud Park recordings as a separate disc, while all three were also released separately in the UK on 12" vinyl.

== Reception ==
Professional ratings
Review scores
Source	Rating
Bravewords	8.5/10
Classic Rock	4/5 stars

Reviewing the album for Bravewords, Mark Gromen described All You Can Eat as "a worthy introduction" to the band's 2015 tenth studio album Wonder Days, praising the collection's "passionate, storytelling lyrics, slide and reverb guitar, plus an amazingly clear production". Gromen concluded his review by proposing that "You'd be hard pressed to find a more consistent, bluesy hard rock band over the last 2+ decades", awarding the album a rating of 8.5 out of 10. Essi Berelian of Classic Rock claimed that All You Can Eat "will provide fans ample opportunity to gorge themselves stupid, over and over again".

== Track listing ==
=== Starter: Live at RAK Studio 1 ===
No.	Title	Writer(s)	Length
1.	"Wonder Days"	Luke Morley	5:08
2.	"The Thing I Want"	Morley	3:44
3.	"When the Music Played"	Morley	6:36
4.	"Black Water"	Morley; Lynne Jackaman	4:01
5.	"Resurrection Day"	Morley	4:37
6.	"I Love the Weekend"	Morley	3:33
7.	"Chasing Shadows"	Morley	4:04
8.	"Serpentine"	Morley	4:47
9.	"Be Good to Yourself" (Andy Fraser cover)	Andy Fraser	3:13
10.	"The Rocker" (Thin Lizzy cover)	Phil Lynott; Eric Bell; Brian Downey	3:37
11.	"Superstition" (Stevie Wonder cover)	Stevie Wonder	5:01
12.	"Up Around the Bend" (Creedence Clearwater Revival cover)	John Fogerty	3:26
13.	"I'm Down" (The Beatles cover)	John Lennon; Paul McCartney	2:55
14.	"The Stealer" (Free cover)	Paul Rodgers; Paul Kossoff; Andy Fraser	3:38
Total length:			58:16

=== Main course: Live at the Brooklyn Bowl ===
No.	Title	Writer(s)	Length
1.	"Backstreet Symphony"	Morley	5:06
2.	"The Thing I Want"	Morley	4:02
3.	"Black Water"	Morley; Jackaman	5:23
4.	"Low Life in High Places"	Morley	6:10
5.	"Be Good to Yourself" (Andy Fraser cover)	Fraser	3:23
6.	"Wonder Days"	Morley	5:15
7.	"The Devil Made Me Do It"	Morley	5:20
8.	"Resurrection Day"	Morley	5:01
9.	"Stand Up"	Morley; James	4:23
10.	"The Rocker" (Thin Lizzy cover)	Lynott; Bell; Downey	3:50
11.	"Love Walked In"	Morley	7:31
12.	"Dirty Love"	Morley	11:58
13.	"Up Around the Bend" (Creedence Clearwater Revival cover)	Fogerty	4:17
14.	"Just Another Suicide"	Morley; James	8:15
Total length:			79:54

=== Dessert: Wonder Days: The Film ===
No.	Title	Length
1.	"Wonder Days Documentary Film"	72:00

Live at Loud Park
No.	Title	Writer(s)	Length
1.	"Dirty Love"	Morley	8:25
2.	"The Thing I Want"	Morley	3:45
3.	"Higher Ground"	Morley	7:12
4.	"Wonder Days"	Morley	5:23
5.	"River of Pain"	Morley	3:56
6.	"I Love You More Than Rock 'n' Roll"	Morley	5:47
Total length:			34:28

Live at RAK Studio 1
No.	Title	Writer(s)	Length
1.	"When the Music Played"	Morley	6:36
2.	"Resurrection Day"	Morley	4:37
3.	"I Love the Weekend"	Morley	3:33
4.	"Chasing Shadows"	Morley	4:04
5.	"Serpentine"	Morley	4:47
6.	"I'm Down" (The Beatles cover)	Lennon; McCartney	2:55
7.	"The Stealer" (Free cover)	Rodgers; Kossoff; Fraser	3:38
Total length:			30:10

Live at the Brooklyn Bowl
No.	Title	Writer(s)	Length
1.	"Black Water"	Morley; Jackaman	5:23
2.	"Low Life in High Places"	Morley	6:10
3.	"Be Good to Yourself" (Andy Fraser cover)	Fraser	3:23
4.	"The Rocker" (Thin Lizzy cover)	Lynott; Bell; Downey	3:50
5.	"Love Walked In"	Morley	7:31
6.	"Up Around the Bend" (Creedence Clearwater Revival cover)	Fogerty	4:17
Total length:			30:34

=== Bonus disc: Live at Loud Park ===
No.	Title	Writer(s)	Length
1.	"Dirty Love"	Morley	8:25
2.	"The Thing I Want"	Morley	3:45
3.	"Higher Ground"	Morley	7:12
4.	"Wonder Days"	Morley	5:23
5.	"River of Pain"	Morley	3:56
6.	"I Love You More Than Rock 'n' Roll"	Morley	5:47
Total length:			34:28

== Personnel ==
- Danny Bowes – vocals
- Luke Morley – guitar, piano, backing vocals, production
- Chris Childs – bass, backing vocals, production, mastering
- Gary "Harry" James – drums, percussion
- Peter Shoulder – guitar, backing vocals
- Kenny Dogleash – production
- Nick Brine – engineering, mixing
- Joel Davies – engineering assistance
- Pete Maher – mastering
- Alexander Mertsch – design
- Jason Joyce – photography
- Marty Moffatt – photography

== Bibliography ==
- McIver, Joel (11 November 2016), Giving the Game Away: The Thunder Story, London, England: Omnibus Press, ISBN 978-1785581373
