= Beat Crusaders =

Japanese band

- Also known as: BECR
- Origin: Japan
- Genres: Rock; alternative rock; pop punk; synth-pop; punk rock
- Years active: 1997–2010
- Labels: Lastrum; Naked Teacher; Defstar
- Members: Tōru Hidaka; Masahiko Kubota; Tarō Katō; Hirofumi Yamashita; Keita Tanabe
- Past members: Mitsutaka Umuyashiki; Takayuki Araki; Hiroyuki Tai
- Website: Official website

Beat Crusaders (ビート・クルセイダース, Bīto Kuruseidāsu; typeset as BEAT CRUSADERS) were a Japanese rock band active from 1997 to 2010. During all promotional appearances, their faces are masked by drawings resembling themselves as printed by a dot-matrix printer.

Tōru Hidaka's mask

== History ==
Beat Crusaders, commonly abbreviated BECR, was founded at the end of 1997 by Tōru Hidaka, as an experimental U.S. Lo-Fi Indie Rock unit. The rest of the band later joined as a result of continual experimental gigs performed around the Shimokitazawa area of Tokyo. Their creative use of analog synthesizers and an old Casiotone, incorporated with influences of such bands as Weezer and The Rentals, and at times the dynamism of Snuffesque rock, had transformed them into a powerfully melodic guitar band. By the end of 1998, Beat Crusaders had become known for a crazy and fun live act that was not to be missed. The momentum continued with a single, "E.C.D.T." released in June of the following year which entered independent charts of CD retail shops all across Japan. A month later their first mini-album, Howling Symphony of... was released; this entered the charts again with various music magazines giving a big thumbs up. Reflecting their chart action and praise from magazines, numerous gigs followed with notable bands in the Japanese alternative/independent scene, from guitar pop and new wave, to pop punk and ska bands. They continued to be busy, with their second single "Firestarter" released in early 2000, and the full-length album, "All You Can Eat". They also were involved in four compilations, including a shared EP entitled WXY, with songs from Japanese punk band Captain Hedgehog.

In August 2003, three of the four original members of Beat Crusaders left the band, to eventually go on to form the band Anita Chili Peppers. This left behind only Tōru Hidaka who later recruited four new members. It is not known why the original members left, but it doesn't seem like they left on bad terms, considering Hidaka included the masks of his former bandmates and his actions (he was crying) in the PV, "Sensation".

Later on, their song "Hit in the USA" was used for the opening of the BECK: Mongolian Chop Squad anime, which moved the band into the Japanese mainstream. Since then they released several more albums, including a cover album of American and British songs entitled "Music Crusaders." Their song "Tonight, Tonight, Tonight" was used as the fourth opening of the Bleach anime. In 2006, the band's music made its first American appearance as the opening theme song, "Hey x 2 Look x 2" (AKA "Hey Hey Look Look") to the Nicktoons Network animated series Kappa Mikey. The single "Winterlong" was also used as the opening of the Hero Tales anime.

A full-length CD EPopMaking, was released on May 30, 2007, with 19 tracks, followed by Popdod on June 4, 2008.

In 2010, Toru Hidaka confirmed that Beat Crusaders would break-up, but promised to release one more album. Titled Rest Crusaders, it was released on October 6, 2010, with 22 tracks of both new songs, old singles like "Windom", and previously released but recent singles like "Let It Go" and "Situation".

== Members ==
- Masks cutout guide.
  Tōru Hidaka (ヒダカトオル/日高 央, Hidaka Tōru) - vocals, guitar
- Masahiko Kubota (クボタマサヒコ/久保田 匡彦, Kubota Masahiko) - bass
- Tarō Katō (カトウタロウ/加藤 太朗, Katō Tarō) - guitar
- Mashīta (マシータ; real name Hirofumi Yamashita (山下 博史, Yamashita Hirofumi)) - drums
- Keitaimo (ケイタイモ; real name Keita Tanabe (田辺 啓太, Tanabe Keita)) - keyboard

Former members

- umu (real name Mitsutaka Umuyashiki (産屋敷光孝)) - bass, vocals
- araki (real name Takayuki Araki (荒木隆之)) - drums, vocals
- thai (real name Hiroyuki Tai (田井宏之)) - keyboard, guitar, vocals (died 2011)
- yukio Iwahara(岩原幸夫) - vocals, guitar, bass, drums, programs

| | hidaka | thai | umu | araki | |
| 1999-2003 | | | | | |
| | ヒダカトオル | カトウタロウ | クボタマサヒコ | ケイタイモ | マシータ |
| 2003-2010 | | | | | |

== Discography ==
=== Studio albums ===
| Title | Year | Label |
|---|---|---|
| All You Can Eat | 2000 | Lastrum |
| Foresights | 2001 | Lastrum |
| Sexcite! | 2002 | Lastrum |
| MUSICRUSADERS | 2005 | DefSTAR |
| P.O.A. -POP ON ARRIVAL- | 2005 | DefSTAR |
| EpopMaking: Pop to no Sōgū (EpopMaking ～Popとの遭遇～) | 2007 | DefSTAR |
| popdod | 2008 | DefSTAR |

=== Singles ===
| Title | Year | Label | Notes |
|---|---|---|---|
| "Firestarter" | 2000 | | |
| "Handsome Academy" | 2000 | | |
| "Capa-City" | 2002 | | |
| "Girl Friday" | 2003 | Captain Haus | "Follow me", as one of the songs for BECK: Mongolian Chop Squad. |
| "Sensation" | 2004 | Captain Haus | |
| "Hit in the USA" | 2004 | DefStar | For BECK: Mongolian Chop Squad |
| "Feel" | 2005 | DefStar | |
| "Love Potion No. 9" | 2005 | DefStar | |
| "Day After Day/Solitaire" | 2005 | DefStar | |
| "I Can See Clearly Now" | 2005 | DefStar | |
| "Tonight, Tonight, Tonight" | 2006 | DefStar | The fourth opening for the Bleach anime |
| "Hey Hey Look Look" | 2006 | DefStar | The opening theme for the Kappa Mikey TV show |
| "Ghost" | 2007 | DefStar | |
| "Chinese Jet Set" | 2008 | DefStar | |
| "Winterlong" | 2008 | DefStar | The opening of Juushin Enbu (Hero Tales) |
| "Arienai Kurai Kiseki" (ありえないくらい奇跡) "Much Impossible Miracle" In collaboration with Ayano Tsuji | 2008 | Speedstar | Theme song of third Keroro Gunso movie |
| "Let It Go" | 2009 | DefStar | |
| "Situation" | 2010 | DefStar | |

=== EP/Misc ===
| Title | Year | Type | Label |
|---|---|---|---|
| Never Pop Enough | 1999 | EP | Lastrum |
| Howling Symphony Of... | 1999 | EP | Lastrum |
| A PopCalypse Now: Jigoku no Pop Shiroku (A PopCALYPSE NOW ～地獄のPOP示録～, A Poppukaripusu Nau ~Jigoku no Poppu Shiroku~) | 2004 | EP | DefSTAR |
| Compi Crusaders '68-'77 vol. 37 | 2005 | Compilation | DefSTAR |
| LOST CRUSADERS | 2010 | Live album | DefSTAR |

=== Compilations ===
| Title | Year | Type | Label | Notes |
|---|---|---|---|---|
| BEST CRUSADERS | 2003 | Best of | Lastrum | Compiles songs from their original line-up under Lastrum. |
| VERY BEST CRUSADERS | 2009 | Best of | DefSTAR | Compiles singles released under DefSTAR from 2005. |
| REST CRUSADERS | 2010 | Best of | DefSTAR | Compiles singles, B-sides, and rarities. |
| LUST CRUSADERS | 2010 | Best of | Lastrum | Compiles rare and unreleased songs from their indie discography. |

=== Split albums ===
| Title | Year | Split With | Label |
|---|---|---|---|
| WXY | 2001 | Captain Hedge Hog | Lastrum |
| Diggin' in the Street | 2002 | Rude Bones | Lastrum |
| Ozzy!! | 2002 | Sk@ymate's | Lastrum |
| Booootsy | 2006 | Your Song Is Good | DefSTAR |
| Cell No.9 | 2006 | Tropical Gorilla | DefSTAR |
| Night on the Planet | 2007 | Asapragus | DefSTAR |
